This list of battles is organized  geographically, by country in its present territory.

Afghanistan 

 Battle of the Arius – 208 BC – Antiochus's Bactrian Campaign
 Siege of Bactra – 208 BC – 206 BC – Antiochus's Bactrian Campaign
 Battle of Herat (484) – 484 – Hephthalite–Sasanian Wars
 Siege of Herat (652) – 652 – Muslim conquest of Khorasan (Muslim conquest of Persia)
 Battle of Badghis – 654 – Muslim conquest of Khorasan (Muslim conquest of Persia)
 Battle of the Baggage – 737 – Muslim conquest of Transoxiana
 Battle of Kharistan – 737 – Muslim conquest of Transoxiana
 Battle of Parwan – 1221 – Mongol invasion of the Khwarazmian Empire
 Siege of Balkh (1370) – 1370 – Timurid conquests and invasions
 Occupation of Balkh (1447) – 1447 – Timurid wars of succession
 Siege of Balkh (1447) – 1447 – Timurid wars of succession
 Battle of Tarnab (1448) – 1448 – Timurid wars of succession
 Siege of Herat (1448) – 1448 – Timurid wars of succession
 Siege of Kabul (1504) – 1504
 Battle of Qalat – 1506
 Battle of Ab Darrah Pass – 1511 – Timurid-Uzbek Wars
 Battle of Herat (1598) – 1598 – Persian–Uzbek wars
 Siege of Kandahar (1605–1606) – 1605 – 1606 – Mughal–Persian Wars
 Mughal sieges of Kandahar (1649–1653) – 1649, 1652 and 1653 – Mughal–Safavid War (1649–1653)
 Battle of Kafer Qal'eh – 1729 – Herat Campaign of 1729 (Campaigns of Nader Shah)
 Battle of Herat (1729) – 1729 – Herat Campaign of 1729 (Campaigns of Nader Shah)
 Siege of Kandahar – 1737 – 1738 – Qandahar Campaign of 1737 (Campaigns of Nader Shah)
 Siege of Herat (1837–1838) – 1837 – 1838 – Great Game
 Battle of Ghazni – 1839 – First Anglo-Afghan War (Great Game)
 Battle of Jellalabad – 1841 – 1842 – First Anglo-Afghan War (Great Game)
 Battle of Gandamak – 1842 – First Anglo-Afghan War (Great Game)

Albania 

 Siege of Pelium – 335 BC – Alexander's Balkan campaign (Wars of Alexander the Great)
 Battle of the Aous (274 BC) – 274 BC 
 Battle of Phoenice – 230 BC – First Illyrian War
 Battle of Epidamnus – 229 BC – First Illyrian War
 Siege of Epidamnus – 229 BC – First Illyrian War
 Battle of the Aous (198 BC) – 198 BC – Second Macedonian War (Macedonian Wars)
 Siege of Oricum – 48 BC – Caesar's civil war
 Battle of Dyrrhachium (48 BC) – 48 BC – Caesar's civil war
 Battle of Dyrrhachium (1018) – 1018 – Byzantine conquest of Bulgaria (Byzantine–Bulgarian wars)
 Battle of Dyrrhachium (1081) – 1081 – First Norman invasion of the Balkans
 Siege of Dyrrhachium (1107–1108) – 1107 – 1108 – Byzantine–Norman wars
 Battle of Saseno – 1264 – War of Saint Sabas
 Battle of Savra – 1385 – Serbian-Ottoman wars (Ottoman wars in Europe)
 Battle of Torvioll – 1444 – Skanderbeg's rebellion (Ottoman wars in Europe)
 Siege of Krujë (1450) – 1450 – Skanderbeg's rebellion (Ottoman wars in Europe)
 Siege of Berat (1455) – 1455  – Skanderbeg's rebellion (Ottoman wars in Europe)
 Battle of Albulena – 1457 – Skanderbeg's rebellion (Ottoman wars in Europe)
 Battle of Sati – 1459 – Skanderbeg's rebellion (Ottoman wars in Europe)
 Battle of Mokra (July 1462) – 1462 – Skanderbeg's rebellion (Ottoman wars in Europe)
 Siege of Krujë (1466–1467) – 1466 – 1467 – Skanderbeg's rebellion and Ottoman–Venetian War (1463–1479) (Ottoman–Venetian wars) [Ottoman wars in Europe]
 Siege of Krujë (1467) – 1467 – Skanderbeg's rebellion (Ottoman wars in Europe)
 Siege of Shkodra (1474) – 1474 – Ottoman–Venetian War (1463–1479) (Ottoman–Venetian wars) [Ottoman wars in Europe]
 Siege of Krujë (1478) – 1477 – 1478 – Ottoman–Venetian War (1463–1479) (Ottoman–Venetian wars) [Ottoman wars in Europe]

Algeria 

 Battle of Cirta – 203 BC – Second Punic War (Punic Wars)
 Siege of Cirta – 113 BC – 112 BC – Jugurthine War
 Battle of Suthul – 110 BC – Jugurthine War
 Second Battle of Cirta – 106 BC – Jugurthine War
 Battle of Hippo Regius – 46 BC – Caesar's civil war
 Siege of Hippo Regius – 430 – 431 – Fall of the Western Roman Empire and Roman–Germanic wars
 Battle of Vescera – 682 or 683 – Muslim conquest of the Maghreb (Arab–Byzantine wars)
 Battle of Mamma – 688 – Muslim conquest of the Maghreb (Arab–Byzantine wars)
 Battle of Oued Zadidja – 1551 – Conflicts between the Regency of Algiers and Morocco
 Battle of Tlemcen (1551) – 1551 – Conflicts between the Regency of Algiers and Morocco
 Battle of Tlemcen (1557) – 1557 – Conflicts between the Regency of Algiers and Morocco
 Siege of Oran (1693) – 1693 – Conflicts between the Regency of Algiers and Morocco
 Battle of Jouami' al-Ulama – 1700 – Maghrebi war (1699–1702) (Conflicts between the Regency of Algiers and Morocco)
 Battle of Chelif – 1701 – Maghrebi war (1699–1702) (Conflicts between the Regency of Algiers and Morocco)
 Bombardment of Algiers (1816) – 1816

Angola
 Battle of Kombi – 1647 – Dutch–Portuguese War
 Battle of Mbwila – 1665 – Portuguese colonisation of Africa and Kongo Civil War
 Battle of Mbidizi River – 1670 – Portuguese colonisation of Africa and Kongo Civil War
 Battle of Kitombo – 1670 – Portuguese colonisation of Africa and Kongo Civil War
 Battle of São Salvador – 1709 – Kongo Civil War
 Battle of Quifangondo – 1975 – Angolan Civil War
 Battle of Cassinga – 1978 – South African Border War
 Battle of Cuito Cuanavale – 1987 – 1988 – Angolan Civil War and South African Border War

Argentina
 Action of 2 June 1807 – 1807 – British invasions of the River Plate (Anglo-Spanish War (1796–1808)) [French Revolutionary and Napoleonic Wars]
 Battle of Miserere – 1807 – British invasions of the River Plate (Anglo-Spanish War (1796–1808)) [French Revolutionary and Napoleonic Wars]
 Battle of Tucumán – 1812 – Argentine War of Independence (Spanish American wars of independence)
 Battle of San Lorenzo – 1813 – Second Banda Oriental campaign (Argentine War of Independence) [Spanish American wars of independence]
 Battle of Salta – 1813 – Argentine War of Independence (Spanish American wars of independence)
 Battle of Martín García (1814) – 1814 – Second Banda Oriental campaign (Argentine War of Independence) [Spanish American wars of independence]
 Battle of Yavi – 1816 – Argentine War of Independence (Spanish American wars of independence)
 Battle of Apóstoles – 1817 – Portuguese conquest of the Banda Oriental
 Battle of San Carlos (1817) – 1817 or 1818 – Portuguese conquest of the Banda Oriental
 Battle of Cepeda (1820) – 1820 – Argentine Civil Wars
 Battle of Punta Colares – 1826 – Cisplatine War
 Battle of Quilmes – 1826 – Cisplatine War
 Battle of Carmen de Patagones – 1827 – Cisplatine War
 Battle of Monte Santiago – 1827 – Cisplatine War
 Battle of Arroyo Grande – 1842 – Uruguayan Civil War
 Battle of Vuelta de Obligado – 1845 – Anglo-French blockade of the Río de la Plata
 Battle of Caseros – 1852 – Uruguayan Civil War, Argentine Civil Wars and Platine War
 Battle of Pavón – 1861 – Argentine Civil Wars
 Battle of Riachuelo – 1865 – Paraguayan War
 Battle of Los Corrales – 1880

Armenia
 Battle of Artaxata – 68 BC – Third Mithridatic War (Mithridatic Wars)
 Battle of Varnakert – 702
 Battle of Bagrevand – 775
 Battle of Sevan – 921
 Battle of Yeghevārd – 1735 – Caucasus Campaign (1735) (Ottoman–Persian War (1730–1735))
 Battle of Echmiadzin (1804) – 1804 – Russo-Persian War (1804–1813)
 Siege of Erivan (1804) – 1804 – Russo-Persian War (1804–1813)
 Battle of Arpachai – 1807 – Russo-Turkish War (1806–1812)
 Siege of Erivan (1808) – 1808 – Russo-Persian War (1804–1813)
 Capture of Erivan – 1827 – Russo-Persian War (1826–1828)
 Battle of Alexandropol – 1920 – Turkish–Armenian War

Australia
 Battle of Richmond Hill – 1795 – Hawkesbury and Nepean Wars (Australian frontier wars)
 Battle of Parramatta – 1797 – Hawkesbury and Nepean Wars (Australian frontier wars)
 Battle of Bond's Farm – 1809 – Hawkesbury and Nepean Wars (Australian frontier wars)
 Appin Massacre – 1816 – Hawkesbury and Nepean Wars (Australian frontier wars)
 Pinjarra massacre – 1834
 Mount Cottrell massacre – 1836 – Port Phillip District Wars
 Battle of Broken River – 1838 – Port Phillip District Wars
 Campaspe Plains massacre – 1839 – Port Phillip District Wars
 Blood Hole massacre – 1839 or 1840 – Port Phillip District Wars
 Battle of the Coral Sea – 1942 – World War II

Austria
 Battle of Carnuntum – 170 – Marcomannic Wars (Roman–Germanic wars)
 Battle of Wels – 943 – Hungarian invasions of Europe
 Battle on the Marchfeld (also Battle of Dürnkrut and Jedenspeigen) – 1278 – Great Interregnum
 Battle of Waidhofen – 1431 – Hussite Wars
 Siege of Hainburg – 1482 – Austrian–Hungarian War (1477–1488)
 Battle of Leitzersdorf – 1484 – Austrian–Hungarian War (1477–1488)
 Siege of Vienna (1485) – 1485 – Austrian–Hungarian War (1477–1488)
 Siege of Retz – 1486 – Austrian–Hungarian War (1477–1488)
 Siege of Wiener Neustadt – 1486 – 1487 – Austrian–Hungarian War (1477–1488)
 Battle of Hard – 1499 – Swabian War
 Battle of Frastanz – 1499 – Swabian War
 Siege of Vienna – 1529 – Ottoman wars in Europe and Ottoman–Habsburg wars
 Battle of Leobersdorf – 1532 – Habsburg–Ottoman wars in Hungary (1526–1568) (Ottoman–Habsburg wars) [Ottoman wars in Europe]
 Battle of Vienna – 1683 – Great Turkish War, Ottoman–Habsburg wars and Polish–Ottoman War (1683–1699)
 Battle of Saint Gotthard (1705) – 1705 – Rákóczi's War of Independence (War of the Spanish Succession)
 Battle of St. Pölten – 1741 – War of the Austrian Succession
 Battle of Schärding – 1742 – War of the Austrian Succession
 Capitulation of Linz – 1742 – War of the Austrian Succession
 Battle of Feldkirch – 1799 – War of the Second Coalition (French Revolutionary Wars)
 Battle of Mehrnbach – 1805 – War of the Third Coalition (Napoleonic Wars)
 Battle of Lambach – 1805 – War of the Third Coalition (Napoleonic Wars)
 Battle of Amstetten – 1805 – War of the Third Coalition (Napoleonic Wars)
 Battle of Mariazell – 1805 – War of the Third Coalition (Napoleonic Wars)
 Battle of Dürenstein – 1805 – War of the Third Coalition (Napoleonic Wars)
 Battle of Schöngrabern – 1805 – War of the Third Coalition (Napoleonic Wars)
 Battles of Bergisel – 1809 – Tyrolean Rebellion (War of the Fifth Coalition) [Napoleonic Wars]
 Battle of Ebelsberg – 1809 – War of the Fifth Coalition (Napoleonic Wars)
 Battle of Wörgl – 1809 – War of the Fifth Coalition (Napoleonic Wars)
 Battle of Linz-Urfahr – 1809 – War of the Fifth Coalition (Napoleonic Wars)
 Battle of Aspern-Essling – 1809 – War of the Fifth Coalition (Napoleonic Wars)
 Battle of Sankt Michael – 1809 – War of the Fifth Coalition (Napoleonic Wars)
 Battle of Graz – 1809 – War of the Fifth Coalition (Napoleonic Wars)
 Battle of Wagram – 1809 – War of the Fifth Coalition (Napoleonic Wars)
 Combat of Korneuburg – 1809 – War of the Fifth Coalition (Napoleonic Wars)
 Combat of Stockerau – 1809 – War of the Fifth Coalition (Napoleonic Wars)
 Battle of Hollabrunn (1809) – 1809 – War of the Fifth Coalition (Napoleonic Wars)
 Combat of Schöngrabern – 1809 – War of the Fifth Coalition (Napoleonic Wars)
 Battle of Feistritz – 1813 – War of the Sixth Coalition (Napoleonic Wars)

Azerbaijan
 Battle of Ganja (1046) – 1046 – Byzantine–Seljuk wars and Georgian–Seljuk wars
 Siege of Ganja (1213) – 1213
 Battle of Qarabagh – 1469 – Timurid–Aq Qoyunlu Wars
 Battle of Mollahasanli – 1578 – Ottoman–Safavid War (1578–1590) (Ottoman–Persian Wars)
 Siege of Ganja (1606) – 1606 – Ottoman–Safavid War (1603–1618) (Ottoman–Persian Wars)
 Siege of Ganja (1734) – 1734 – 1735 – Caucasus Campaign (1735) (Ottoman–Persian War (1730–1735))
 Battle of Ganja (1804) – 1803 – 1804 – Russo-Persian War (1804–1813)
 Battle of Sultanabad – 1812 – Russo-Persian War (1804–1813)
 Siege of Lankaran – 1813 – Russo-Persian War (1804–1813)
 Battle of Ganja (1826) – 1826 – Russo-Persian War (1826–1828)
 Battle of Shusha (1992) – 1992 – First Nagorno-Karabakh War
 Battle of Aghdam – 1993 – First Nagorno-Karabakh War
 Battle of Kalbajar – 1993 – First Nagorno-Karabakh War

Bahamas
 Raid on Nassau – 1703 – War of the Spanish Succession
 Raid on Nassau (1720) – 1720 – War of the Quadruple Alliance
 Raid of Nassau – 1776 – American Revolutionary War
 Capture of the Bahamas (1782) – 1782 – American Revolutionary War
 Capture of the Bahamas (1783) – 1783 – American Revolutionary War

Bahrain
 Siege of Bahrain – 1559 – Ottoman–Portuguese conflicts (1538–1559) (Ottoman–Portuguese confrontations)
 Bombing of Bahrain in World War II – 1940 – World War II

Bangladesh
 Battle of Ramu – 1824 – First Anglo-Burmese War
 Battle of Garibpur – 1971 – Bangladesh Liberation War
 Battle of Hilli – 1971 – Bangladesh Liberation War
 Battle of Sylhet – 1971 – Bangladesh Liberation War and Indo-Pakistani War of 1971

Barbados
 Battle of Barbados (1665) – 1665 – Second Anglo-Dutch War (Anglo-Dutch Wars)
 Battle off Barbados – 1778 – American Revolutionary War

Belarus
 Battle on the Nemiga River – 1067
 Battle of Ashmyany – 1432 – Lithuanian Civil War (1432–1438)
 Battle of Mstislavl – 1501 – Muscovite–Lithuanian Wars
 Battle of Kletsk – 1506 – Muscovite–Lithuanian Wars and Crimean–Nogai slave raids in Eastern Europe
 Battle of Orsha – 1514 – Muscovite–Lithuanian Wars
 Siege of Polotsk – 1518 – Muscovite–Lithuanian Wars
 Battle of Ula – 1564 – Livonian War (Polish-Russian Wars, Polish–Swedish wars and Russo-Swedish Wars)
 Battle of Mazyr – 1649 – Khmelnytsky Uprising (Deluge (history))
 Battle of Loyew (1649) – 1649 – Khmelnytsky Uprising (Deluge (history))
 Battle of Zahal – 1649 – Khmelnytsky Uprising (Deluge (history))
 Battle of Loyew (1651) – 1651 – Khmelnytsky Uprising (Deluge (history))
 Battle of Shepeleviche – 1654 – Russo-Polish War (1654–1667) (Polish-Russian Wars)
 Battle of Shklow – 1654 – Russo-Polish War (1654–1667) (Polish-Russian Wars)
 Battle of Myadel – 1659 – Russo-Polish War (1654–1667) (Polish-Russian Wars)
 Siege of Lyakhavichy – 1660 – Russo-Polish War (1654–1667) (Polish-Russian Wars)
 Battle of Polonka – 1660 – Russo-Polish War (1654–1667) (Polish-Russian Wars)
 Battle of Basya – 1660 – Russo-Polish War (1654–1667) (Polish-Russian Wars)
 Battle of Kushliki – 1661 – Russo-Polish War (1654–1667) (Polish-Russian Wars)
 Battle of Grodno (1706) – 1706 – Swedish invasion of Poland (1701–1706) (Great Northern War) [Northern Wars]
 Battle of Kletsk (1706) – 1706 – Swedish invasion of Poland (1701–1706) (Great Northern War) [Northern Wars]
 Battle of Grodno (1708) – 1708 – Swedish invasion of Russia (Great Northern War) [Northern Wars]
 Battle of Holowczyn – 1708 – Swedish invasion of Russia (Great Northern War) [Northern Wars]
 Battle of Malatitze – 1708 – Swedish invasion of Russia (Great Northern War) [Northern Wars]
 Battle of Lesnaya – 1708 – Swedish invasion of Russia (Great Northern War) [Northern Wars]
 Battle of Stołowicze – 1771 – Bar Confederation
 Battle of Opsa – 1792 – Polish–Russian War of 1792 
 Battle of Mir – 1792 – Polish–Russian War of 1792
 Battle of Brest (1794) – 1794 – Kościuszko Uprising
 Battle of Mir (1812) – 1812 – French invasion of Russia (Napoleonic Wars)
 Battle of Saltanovka – 1812 – French invasion of Russia (Napoleonic Wars)
 Battle of Ostrovno – 1812 – French invasion of Russia (Napoleonic Wars)
 Battle of Vitebsk (1812) – 1812 – French invasion of Russia (Napoleonic Wars)
 Battle of Kobrin – 1812 – French invasion of Russia (Napoleonic Wars)
 Battle of Klyastitsy – 1812 – French invasion of Russia (Napoleonic Wars)
 Battle of Swolna – 1812 – French invasion of Russia (Napoleonic Wars)
 Battle of Gorodechno – 1812 – French invasion of Russia (Napoleonic Wars)
 First Battle of Polotsk – 1812 – French invasion of Russia (Napoleonic Wars)
 Second Battle of Polotsk – 1812 – French invasion of Russia (Napoleonic Wars)
 Battle of Chashniki – 1812 – French invasion of Russia (Napoleonic Wars)
 Battle of Nowo Schwerschen – 1812 – French invasion of Russia (Napoleonic Wars)
 Battle of Smoliani – 1812 – French invasion of Russia (Napoleonic Wars)
 Battle of Wolkowisk – 1812 – French invasion of Russia (Napoleonic Wars)
 Battle of Kaidanowo – 1812 – French invasion of Russia (Napoleonic Wars)
 Battle of Borisov – 1812 – French invasion of Russia (Napoleonic Wars)
 Battle of Loschniza – 1812 – French invasion of Russia (Napoleonic Wars)
 Battle of Berezina – 1812 – French invasion of Russia (Napoleonic Wars)
 Battle of Bereza Kartuska – 1919 – Polish–Soviet War

Belgium
 Battle of the Sabis – 57 BC – Gallic Wars
 Siege of the Atuatuci – 57 BC – Gallic Wars
 Ambiorix's revolt – 54 BC – Gallic Wars
 Battle of Amblève – 716 – Frankish Civil War and Frisian–Frankish wars
 Battle of Thimeon – 880 – Viking expansion
 Battle of Leuven – 891 – Viking expansion
 Battle of Damme – 1213 – Anglo-French War (1213–1214)
 Battle of Steppes – 1213
 Battle of Furnes – 1297 – Franco-Flemish War
 Matins of Bruges – 1302 – Franco-Flemish War
 Battle of the Golden Spurs – 1302 – Franco-Flemish War
 Siege of Tournai (1340) – 1340 – Tournaisis campaign of 1340 (Edwardian Phase) [Hundred Years' War]
 Battle of Beverhoutsveld – 1382 – Revolt of Ghent (1379–1385) (Caroline War) [Hundred Years' War]
 Battle of Roosebeke or Battle of Westrozebeke – 1382 – Revolt of Ghent (1379–1385) (Caroline War) [Hundred Years' War]
 Siege of Ypres (1383) – 1383 – Despenser's Crusade (Revolt of Ghent (1379–1385)) [Caroline War] [Hundred Years' War]
 Battle of Othée – 1408 
 Siege of Oudenaarde – 1452 – Revolt of Ghent (1449–1453) 
 Battle of Bazel – 1452 – Revolt of Ghent (1449–1453) 
 Battle of Gavere – 1453 – Revolt of Ghent (1449–1453)
 Battle of Brustem – 1467 – Second Liège War
 Six hundred Franchimontois – 1468 – Third Liège War
 Siege of Tournai (1513) – 1513 – War of the League of Cambrai (Italian Wars)
 Siege of Tournai (1521) – 1521 – Italian War of 1521–1526 (Italian Wars)
 Battle of Oosterweel – 1567 – Eighty Years' War, 1566–1572 (Eighty Years' War) [European wars of religion]
 Battle of Jodoigne – 1568 – Eighty Years' War, 1566–1572 (Eighty Years' War) [European wars of religion]
 Siege of Mons (1572) – 1572 – French Wars of Religion, Anglo-Spanish War and Eighty Years' War, 1572–1576 (Eighty Years' War) [European wars of religion]
 Spanish Fury at Mechelen – 1572 – Eighty Years' War, 1572–1576 (Eighty Years' War) [European wars of religion]
 Battle of Lillo – 1574 – Eighty Years' War, 1572–1576 (Eighty Years' War) [European wars of religion]
 Sack of Antwerp – 1576 – Eighty Years' War, 1576–1579 (Eighty Years' War) [European wars of religion]
 Battle of Gembloux (1578) – 1578 – Anglo-Spanish War and Eighty Years' War, 1576–1579 (Eighty Years' War) [European wars of religion]
 Battle of Rijmenam (1578) – 1578 – Anglo-Spanish War and Eighty Years' War, 1576–1579 (Eighty Years' War) [European wars of religion]
 Battle of Borgerhout – 1579 – Anglo-Spanish War and Eighty Years' War, 1576–1579 (Eighty Years' War) [European wars of religion]
 English Fury at Mechelen – 1580 – Anglo-Spanish War and Eighty Years' War, 1579–1588 (Eighty Years' War) [European wars of religion]
 Taking of Diest (1580) – 1580 – Eighty Years' War, 1579–1588 (Eighty Years' War) [European wars of religion]
 Siege of Lier (1582) – 1582 – Anglo-Spanish War and Eighty Years' War, 1579–1588 (Eighty Years' War) [European wars of religion]
 French Fury – 1583 – Eighty Years' War, 1579–1588 (Eighty Years' War) [European wars of religion]
 Siege of Ghent (1583–1584) – 1583 – 1584 – Eighty Years' War, 1579–1588 (Eighty Years' War) [European wars of religion]
 Capture of Aalst (1584) – 1584 – Anglo-Spanish War and Eighty Years' War, 1579–1588 (Eighty Years' War) [European wars of religion]
 Fall of Antwerp – 1584 – 1585 – Eighty Years' War, 1579–1588 (Eighty Years' War) [European wars of religion]
 Siege of Huy (1595) – 1595 – Anglo-Spanish War (1585–1604) and Ten Years (Eighty Years' War) (Eighty Years' War) [European wars of religion]
 Sack of Lier – 1595 – Ten Years (Eighty Years' War) (Eighty Years' War) [European wars of religion]
 Battle of Turnhout (1597) – 1597 – Anglo-Spanish War (1585–1604) and Ten Years (Eighty Years' War) (Eighty Years' War) [European wars of religion]
 Battle of Nieuwpoort – 1600 – Anglo-Spanish War (1585–1604) and Eighty Years' War, 1599–1609 (Eighty Years' War) [European wars of religion]
 Siege of Ostend – 1601 – 1604 – Anglo-Spanish War (1585–1604) and Eighty Years' War, 1599–1609 (Eighty Years' War) [European wars of religion]
 Siege of Hoogstraten – 1603 – Anglo-Spanish War (1585–1604) and Eighty Years' War, 1599–1609 (Eighty Years' War) [European wars of religion]
 Battle of Fleurus (1622) – 1622 – Eighty Years' War, 1621–1648 and Palatinate campaign (Eighty Years' War and Thirty Years' War) [European wars of religion]
 Battle of Les Avins – 1635 – Franco-Spanish War (1635–1659) (Thirty Years' War)
 Siege of Leuven – 1635 – Eighty Years' War, 1621–1648 and Franco-Spanish War (1635–1659) (Eighty Years' War and Thirty Years' War) [European wars of religion]
 Battle of Kallo – 1638 – Eighty Years' War, 1621–1648 (Eighty Years' War and Thirty Years' War) [European wars of religion]
 Battle of Seneffe – 1674 – Franco-Dutch War
 Siege of Ypres (1678) – 1678 – Franco-Dutch War
 Battle of Saint-Denis (1678) – 1678 – Franco-Dutch War
 Battle of Walcourt – 1689 – Nine Years' War
 Battle of Fleurus – 1690 – Nine Years' War
 Siege of Mons (1691) – 1691 – Nine Years' War
 Battle of Leuze – 1691 – Nine Years' War
 Siege of Namur (1692) – 1692 – Nine Years' War
 Battle of Steenkerque – 1692 – Nine Years' War
 Battle of Landen – 1693 – Nine Years' War
 Siege of Huy (1694) – 1694 – Nine Years' War
 Siege of Namur (1695) – 1695 – Nine Years' War
 Capitulation of Diksmuide – 1695 – Nine Years' War
 Bombardment of Brussels – 1695 – Nine Years' War
 Siege of Ath (1697) – 1697 – Nine Years' War
 Battle of Ekeren – 1703 – War of the Spanish Succession
 Battle of Elixheim – 1705 – War of the Spanish Succession
 Siege of Zoutleeuw – 1705 – War of the Spanish Succession
 Battle of Ramillies – 1706 – War of the Spanish Succession
 Siege of Ostend (1706) – 1706 – War of the Spanish Succession
 Battle of Oudenaarde – 1708 – War of the Spanish Succession
 Battle of Wijnendale – 1708 – War of the Spanish Succession
 Siege of Ghent (1708) – 1708 – War of the Spanish Succession
 Battle of Fontenoy – 1745 – War of the Austrian Succession
 Battle of Melle – 1745 – War of the Austrian Succession
 Fall of Ghent – 1745 – War of the Austrian Succession
 Siege of Ostend (1745) – 1745 – War of the Austrian Succession
 Siege of Brussels – 1746 – War of the Austrian Succession
 Battle of Rocoux – 1746 – War of the Austrian Succession
 Battle of Lauffeld – 1747 – War of the Austrian Succession
 Action of 15 June 1780 – 1780 – American Revolutionary War
 Battle of Turnhout (1789) – 1789 – Brabant Revolution
 Battle of Falmagne – 1790 – Brabant Revolution
 First battle of Quiévrain (1792) – 1792 – War of the First Coalition (French Revolutionary Wars)
 Battle of Marquain – 1792 – War of the First Coalition (French Revolutionary Wars)
 Second battle of Quiévrain (1792) – 1792 – War of the First Coalition (French Revolutionary Wars)
 Battle of Harelbeke – 1792 – War of the First Coalition (French Revolutionary Wars)
 Battle of Jemappes – 1792 – War of the First Coalition (French Revolutionary Wars)
 Battle of Anderlecht – 1792 – War of the First Coalition (French Revolutionary Wars)
 Siege of Namur (1792) – 1792 – War of the First Coalition (French Revolutionary Wars)
 Battle of Neerwinden (1793) – 1793 – War of the First Coalition (French Revolutionary Wars)
 Battle of Arlon (1793) – 1793 – War of the First Coalition (French Revolutionary Wars)
 Battle of Menin (1793) – 1793 – War of the First Coalition (French Revolutionary Wars)
 Battle of Courtrai (1793) – 1793 – War of the First Coalition (French Revolutionary Wars)
 Battle of Arlon (1794) – 1794 – War of the First Coalition (French Revolutionary Wars)
 Battle of Mouscron – 1794 – War of the First Coalition (French Revolutionary Wars)
 Battle of Willems – 1794 – War of the First Coalition (French Revolutionary Wars)
 Battle of Courtrai (1794) – 1794 – War of the First Coalition (French Revolutionary Wars)
 Battle of Grand-Reng – 1794 – War of the First Coalition (French Revolutionary Wars)
 Battle of Erquelinnes – 1794 – War of the First Coalition (French Revolutionary Wars)
 Battle of Tournay (1794) – 1794 – War of the First Coalition (French Revolutionary Wars)
 Battle of Gosselies – 1794 – War of the First Coalition (French Revolutionary Wars)
 Siege of Ypres (1794) – 1794 – War of the First Coalition (French Revolutionary Wars)
 Battle of Lambusart – 1794 – War of the First Coalition (French Revolutionary Wars)
 Battle of Fleurus (1794) – 1794 – War of the First Coalition (French Revolutionary Wars)
 Battle of Sprimont – 1794 – War of the First Coalition (French Revolutionary Wars)
 Battle of Hasselt (1798) – 1798 – Boerenkrijg
 Battle of Hoogstraten – 1814 – War of the Sixth Coalition (Napoleonic Wars)
 Siege of Antwerp (1814) – 1814 – War of the Sixth Coalition (Napoleonic Wars)
 Battle of Courtrai (1814) – 1814 – War of the Sixth Coalition (Napoleonic Wars)
 Battle of Quatre Bras – 1815 – Hundred Days (Napoleonic Wars)
 Battle of Ligny – 1815 – Hundred Days (Napoleonic Wars)
 Battle of Waterloo – 1815 – Hundred Days (Napoleonic Wars)
 Battle of Wavre – 1815 – Hundred Days (Napoleonic Wars)
 Battle of Ravels – 1831 – Ten days' campaign
 Battle of Turnhout (1831) – 1831 – Ten days' campaign
 Battle of Hasselt – 1831 – Ten days' campaign
 Battle of Leuven (1831) – 1831 – Ten days' campaign
 Battle of Liège – 1914 – World War I
 Battle of Mons – 1914 – World War I
 Battle of the Yser – 1914 – World War I
 Battle of Passchendaele – 1917 – World War I
 Battle of the Lys (1918) – 1918 – World War I
 Battle of the Lys and the Escaut – 1918 – World War I
 Battle of France – 1940 – World War II
 Battle of Gembloux (1940) – 1940 – World War II
 Battle of the Lys (1940) – 1940 – World War II
 Battle of the Scheldt – 1944 – World War II
 Battle of the Bulge – 1944 – 1945 – World War II

Belize 

 Capture of Río Hondo – 1779 – American Revolutionary War
 Capture of Cayo Cocina – 1779 – American Revolutionary War
 Battle of St. George's Caye – 1798 – Anglo-Spanish War (1796–1808) (French Revolutionary and Napoleonic Wars)

Bolivia 

 Battle of Huarina – 1547 – Spanish conquest of the Inca Empire
 Battle of Cotagaita – 1810 – Bolivian War of Independence and Argentine War of Independence (Spanish American wars of independence)
 Battle of Suipacha – 1810 – Bolivian War of Independence and Argentine War of Independence (Spanish American wars of independence)
 Battle of Huaqui – 1811 – Bolivian War of Independence and Argentine War of Independence (Spanish American wars of independence)
 Battle of Pequereque – 1813 – Bolivian War of Independence and Argentine War of Independence (Spanish American wars of independence)
 Battle of Vilcapugio – 1813 – Bolivian War of Independence and Argentine War of Independence (Spanish American wars of independence)
 Action of Tambo Nuevo – 1813 – Bolivian War of Independence and Argentine War of Independence (Spanish American wars of independence)
 Battle of Ayohuma – 1813 – Bolivian War of Independence and Argentine War of Independence (Spanish American wars of independence)
 Battle of Viluma – 1815 – Bolivian War of Independence and Argentine War of Independence (Spanish American wars of independence)
 Battle of la Tablada de Tolomosa – 1817 – Bolivian War of Independence and Argentine War of Independence (Spanish American wars of independence)

Bosnia and Herzegovina
 Battle of the Bosnian Highlands – 926 – Croatian–Bulgarian wars
 Battle of Bileća – 1326 – Ottoman conquest of Bosnia and Herzegovina (Ottoman wars in Europe)
 Siege of Jajce – 1463 – Ottoman conquest of Bosnia and Herzegovina (Ottoman wars in Europe)
 Siege of Jajce (1464) – 1464 – Ottoman conquest of Bosnia and Herzegovina and Ottoman–Hungarian wars (Ottoman wars in Europe)
 Battle of Una – 1483 – Hundred Years' Croatian–Ottoman War (Croatian–Ottoman wars, Ottoman–Hungarian wars and Ottoman–Habsburg wars) [Ottoman wars in Europe]
 Battle of Jajce (1518) – 1518 – Hundred Years' Croatian–Ottoman War (Croatian–Ottoman wars, Ottoman–Hungarian wars and Ottoman–Habsburg wars) [Ottoman wars in Europe]
 Siege of Krupa – 1565 – Hundred Years' Croatian–Ottoman War (Croatian–Ottoman wars, Ottoman–Hungarian wars and Ottoman–Habsburg wars) [Ottoman wars in Europe]
 Siege of Bihać (1592) – 1592 – Hundred Years' Croatian–Ottoman War (Croatian–Ottoman wars, Ottoman–Hungarian wars and Ottoman–Habsburg wars) [Ottoman wars in Europe]
 Battle of Derventa – 1688 – Great Turkish War
 Siege of Bihać (1697) – 1697 – Croatian-Slavonian-Dalmatian theater in Great Turkish War (Great Turkish War)
 Battle of Banja Luka – 1737 – Russo-Turkish War (1735–1739)

Brazil
 Battle of São Vicente – 1583 – Anglo-Spanish War
 Capture of Recife (1595) – 1595 – Anglo-Spanish War (1585–1604)
 Capture of Salvador – 1624 – Dutch–Portuguese War
 Recapture of Salvador – 1625 – Dutch–Portuguese War and Eighty Years' War, 1621–1648 (Eighty Years' War and Thirty Years' War) [European wars of religion]
 Siege of Recife (1630) – 1630 – Dutch–Portuguese War
 Battle of Abrolhos – 1631 – Dutch–Portuguese War and Eighty Years' War, 1621–1648 (Eighty Years' War and Thirty Years' War) [European wars of religion]
 Siege of Salvador (1638) – 1638 – Dutch–Portuguese War and Eighty Years' War, 1621–1648 (Eighty Years' War and Thirty Years' War) [European wars of religion]
 Action of 12–17 January 1640 – 1640 – Dutch–Portuguese War and Eighty Years' War, 1621–1648 (Eighty Years' War and Thirty Years' War) [European wars of religion]
 Battle of Tabocas – 1645 – Dutch–Portuguese War
 First Battle of Guararapes – 1648 – Dutch–Portuguese War
 Second Battle of Guararapes – 1649 – Dutch–Portuguese War
 Recapture of Recife (1652–1654) – 1652 – 1654 – Dutch–Portuguese War
 Battle of Rio de Janeiro (1710) – 1710 – War of the Spanish Succession
 Battle of Rio de Janeiro – 1711 – War of the Spanish Succession
 Battle of Santa Ana (1816) – 1816 – Portuguese conquest of the Banda Oriental
 Battle of Ibiraocaí – 1816 – Portuguese conquest of the Banda Oriental
 Battle of Carumbé – 1816 – Portuguese conquest of the Banda Oriental
 Battle of Ibicuí River (1817) – 1817 – Portuguese conquest of the Banda Oriental
 Siege of Salvador (1822–1823) – 1822 – 1823 – War of Independence of Brazil
 Battle of Pirajá – 1822 – War of Independence of Brazil
 Battle of Itaparica – 1823 – War of Independence of Brazil
 Battle of Jenipapo – 1823 – War of Independence of Brazil
 Battle of 4 May – 1823 – War of Independence of Brazil
 Siege of Caxias – 1823 – War of Independence of Brazil
 Battle of Vacacai – 1827 – Cisplatine War
 Battle of Ituzaingó – 1827 – Cisplatine War
 Battle of Yerbal – 1827 – Cisplatine War
 Battle of Azenha Bridge – 1835 – Ragamuffin War
 Capture of Porto Alegre – 1835 – Ragamuffin War

Bulgaria
 Battle of Nicopolis ad Istrum – 250 – Gothic War (248–253) and Crisis of the Third Century
 Battle of Beroe – 250 – Gothic War (248–253) and Crisis of the Third Century
 Siege of Philippopolis (250) – 250 or 251 – Gothic War (248–253) and Crisis of the Third Century
 Battle of Abritus – 251 – Gothic War (248–253) and Crisis of the Third Century
 Battle of Mardia – 316 or 317 – Civil wars of the Tetrarchy
 Battle of Marcianople – 376 – Gothic War (376–382) (Fall of the Western Roman Empire) and Roman–Germanic wars
 Battle of the Willows – 377 – Gothic War (376–382) (Fall of the Western Roman Empire) and Roman–Germanic wars
 Battle of Dibaltum – 377 – Gothic War (376–382) (Fall of the Western Roman Empire) and Roman–Germanic wars
 Battle of the Utus – 447 – Fall of the Western Roman Empire
 Battle of Anchialus (708) – 708 – Byzantine–Bulgarian wars
 Battle of Marcellae (756) – 756 – Byzantine–Bulgarian wars
 Battle of the Rishki Pass – 759 – Byzantine–Bulgarian wars
 Battle of Anchialus (763) – 763 – Byzantine–Bulgarian wars
 Battle of Litosoria – 774 – Byzantine–Bulgarian wars
 Battle of Marcellae – 792 – Byzantine–Bulgarian wars
 Siege of Serdica (809) – 809 – Byzantine–Bulgarian wars
 Battle of Pliska – 811 – Byzantine–Bulgarian wars
 Siege of Debeltos – 812 – Byzantine–Bulgarian wars
 Battle of Versinikia – 813 – Byzantine–Bulgarian wars
 Battle of Achelous (917) – 917 – Byzantine–Bulgarian war of 913–927 (Byzantine–Bulgarian wars)
 Siege of Dorostolon – 971 – Sviatoslav's invasion of Bulgaria (Byzantine–Bulgarian wars)
 Battle of the Gates of Trajan – 986 – Byzantine conquest of Bulgaria (Byzantine–Bulgarian wars)
 Battle of Kleidion – 1014 – Byzantine conquest of Bulgaria (Byzantine–Bulgarian wars)
 Siege of Lovech – 1187 – Battles of the Second Bulgarian Empire (Byzantine–Bulgarian wars)
 Battle of Tryavna – 1190 – Battles of the Second Bulgarian Empire (Byzantine–Bulgarian wars)
 Siege of Varna (1201) – 1201 – Battles of the Second Bulgarian Empire (Byzantine–Bulgarian wars)
 Battle of Beroia (1208) – 1208 – Bulgarian–Latin wars
 Battle of Philippopolis (1208) – 1208 – Bulgarian–Latin wars
 Battle of Klokotnitsa – 1230 – Battles of the Second Bulgarian Empire (Byzantine–Bulgarian wars)
 Battle of Devina – 1279 – Battles of the Second Bulgarian Empire (Byzantine–Bulgarian wars)
 Battle of Skafida – 1304 – Battles of the Second Bulgarian Empire (Byzantine–Bulgarian wars)
 Battle of Rusokastro – 1332 – Battles of the Second Bulgarian Empire (Byzantine–Bulgarian wars)
 Battle of Ihtiman – 1355 – Bulgarian–Ottoman wars
 Siege of Sofia – 1382 or 1385 – Bulgarian–Ottoman wars
 Siege of Tarnovo – 1393 – Bulgarian–Ottoman wars
 Battle of Nicopolis – 1396 – Ottoman–Hungarian wars and Crusades
 Battle of Zlatitsa – 1443 – Crusade of Varna (Crusades, Ottoman–Hungarian wars, Polish–Ottoman Wars and Serbian-Ottoman wars)
 Battle of Varna – 1444 – Crusade of Varna (Crusades, Ottoman–Hungarian wars, Polish–Ottoman Wars and Serbian-Ottoman wars)
 Battle of Kozludzha – 1774 – Russo-Turkish War (1768–1774)
 Battle of Cape Kaliakra – 1791 – Russo-Turkish War (1787–1792)
 Battle of Batin – 1810 – Russo-Turkish War (1806–1812)
 Siege of Varna – 1828 – Russo-Turkish War (1828–1829)
 Battle of Kulevicha – 1829 – Russo-Turkish War (1828–1829)
 Siege of Plevna – 1877 – Russo-Turkish War (1877–1878)
 Battle of Turtucaia – 1916 – Romanian Campaign (World War I)

Cambodia
 Siege of Angkor – 1431
Battle of Kompong Speu – 1970 – Vietnam War
 Operation Chenla I – 1970 – 1971 – Cambodian Civil War (Vietnam War)
 Operation Chenla II – 1971 – Cambodian Civil War (Vietnam War)
 Battle of Snuol – 1971 – Vietnam War
 Battle of Kampot – 1974 Cambodian Civil War (Vietnam War)

Canada

Battle of Sorel – 1610 – Beaver Wars
Battle of Port Royal (1613) – 1613
Action of 17 July 1628 – 1628 – Beaver Wars and Anglo-French War (1627–1629)
Battle of Port Royal (1640) – 1640 – Acadian Civil War
Blockade of St. John (1642) – 1642 – Acadian Civil War
Battle of Penobscot (1643) – 1643 – Acadian Civil War
Battle of Port Royal (1643) – 1643 – Acadian Civil War
Action at Ville-Marie – 1644
Siege of St. John (1645) – 1645 – Acadian Civil War
Raid on St. Ignace and St. Louis – 1649
Battle of Port Royal (1654) – 1654
Battle of Long Sault – 1660 – Beaver Wars
Dutch occupation of Acadia – 1674
Battle of Port La Tour (1677) – Northeast Coast campaign (1677) (First Abenaki War)
Battle of Fort Albany – 1688 – King William's War (Nine Years' War)
Lachine massacre – 1689 – Beaver Wars and King William's War (Nine Years' War)
Battle of the Lake of Two Mountains – 1689 – Beaver Wars
Battle of Port Royal (1690) – 1690 – King William's War (Nine Years' War)
Battle of Chedabucto – 1690 – King William's War (Nine Years' War)
Battle of Coulée Grou – 1690 – Beaver Wars
Battle of Quebec (1690) – 1690 – King William's War (Nine Years' War)
Battle of La Prairie – 1691 – Beaver Wars and King William's War (Nine Years' War)
Naval battle off St. John (1691) – 1691 – King William's War (Nine Years' War)
Mohawk Valley raid – 1692 – Beaver Wars and King William's War (Nine Years' War)
Battle of Placentia (1692) – 1692 – King William's War (Nine Years' War)
Battle of Fort Vercheres – 1692 – Beaver Wars
Battle of Fort Albany (1693) – 1693 – King William's War (Nine Years' War)
Capture of York Factory – 1694 – King William's War (Nine Years' War)
Naval battle off St. John (1696) – 1696 – King William's War (Nine Years' War)
Raid on Chignecto (1696) – 1696 – King William's War (Nine Years' War)
Siege of Fort Nashwaak – 1696 – King William's War (Nine Years' War)
Siege of Ferryland – 1696 – Avalon Peninsula campaign (King William's War) [Nine Years' War]
Raid on Cape Broyle – 1696 – Avalon Peninsula campaign (King William's War) [Nine Years' War]
Raid on Petty Harbour – 1696 – Avalon Peninsula campaign (King William's War) [Nine Years' War]
Siege of St. John (1696) – 1696 – Avalon Peninsula campaign (King William's War) [Nine Years' War]
Raid on Conception Bay – 1697 – Avalon Peninsula campaign (King William's War) [Nine Years' War]
Battle of Carbonear – 1697 – Avalon Peninsula campaign (King William's War) [Nine Years' War]
Battle of Hudson's Bay – 1697 – King William's War (Nine Years' War)
Raid on Grand Pré – 1704 – Queen Anne's War (War of the Spanish Succession and American Indian Wars)
Raid on Chignecto – 1704 – Queen Anne's War (War of the Spanish Succession and American Indian Wars)
Siege of St. John's – 1705 – Queen Anne's War (War of the Spanish Succession and American Indian Wars)
Siege of Port Royal (1707) – 1707 – Queen Anne's War (War of the Spanish Succession and American Indian Wars)
Battle of St. John's – 1709 – Queen Anne's War (War of the Spanish Succession and American Indian Wars)
Battle of Fort Albany (1709) – 1709 – Queen Anne's War (War of the Spanish Succession and American Indian Wars)
Siege of Port Royal (1710) – 1710 – Queen Anne's War (War of the Spanish Succession and American Indian Wars)
Battle of Bloody Creek (1711) – 1711 – Queen Anne's War (War of the Spanish Succession and American Indian Wars)
Battle of Winnepang – 1722 – Dummer's War (American Indian Wars)
Raid on Canso – 1722 – Dummer's War (American Indian Wars)
Raid on Canso – 1723 – Dummer's War (American Indian Wars)
Raid on Annapolis Royal – 1724 – Dummer's War (American Indian Wars)
Raid on Canso – 1725 – Dummer's War (American Indian Wars)
Raid on Canso – 1744 – King George's War (War of the Austrian Succession)
Siege of Annapolis Royal (1744) – 1744 – King George's War (War of the Austrian Succession)
Siege of Annapolis Royal (1745) – 1745 – King George's War (War of the Austrian Succession)
Siege of Port Toulouse – 1745 – King George's War (War of the Austrian Succession)
Siege of Louisbourg (1745) – 1745 – King George's War (War of the Austrian Succession)
Capture of Vigilant – 1745 – King George's War (War of the Austrian Succession)
Naval battle off Tatamagouche – 1745 – King George's War (War of the Austrian Succession)
Battle at Port-la-Joye – 1746 – King George's War (War of the Austrian Succession)
Battle of Grand Pré – 1747 – King George's War (War of the Austrian Succession)
Raid on Dartmouth (1749) – 1749 – Father Le Loutre's War
Siege of Grand Pré – 1749 – Father Le Loutre's War
Battle at St. Croix – 1750 – Father Le Loutre's War
Battle at Chignecto – 1750 – Father Le Loutre's War
Raid on Dartmouth (1751) – 1751 – Father Le Loutre's War
Attack at Mocodome – 1753 – Father Le Loutre's War
Attack at Jeddore – 1753 – Father Le Loutre's War
Battle of Fort Beauséjour – 1755 – Father Le Loutre's War and French and Indian War (Seven Years' War and Sixty Years' War)
Action of 8 June 1755 – 1755 – French and Indian War (Seven Years' War and Sixty Years' War)
Battle of Petitcodiac – 1755 – French and Indian War (Seven Years' War and Sixty Years' War)
Raid on Lunenburg, Nova Scotia (1756) – 1756 – French and Indian War (Seven Years' War and Sixty Years' War)
Battle of Bloody Creek (1757) – 1757 – French and Indian War (Seven Years' War and Sixty Years' War)
Siege of Louisbourg (1758) – 1758 – French and Indian War (Seven Years' War and Sixty Years' War)
Battle of Fort Frontenac – 1758 – French and Indian War (Seven Years' War and Sixty Years' War)
Battle of Beauport – 1759 – Conquest of New France (1758–1760) (French and Indian War) [Seven Years' War and Sixty Years' War]
Battle of the Plains of Abraham – 1759 – Conquest of New France (1758–1760) (French and Indian War) [Seven Years' War and Sixty Years' War]
St. Francis Raid – 1759 – Conquest of New France (1758–1760) (French and Indian War) [Seven Years' War and Sixty Years' War]
Battle of Sainte-Foy – 1760 – Conquest of New France (1758–1760) (French and Indian War) [Seven Years' War and Sixty Years' War]
Siege of Quebec (1760) – 1760 – Conquest of New France (1758–1760) (French and Indian War) [Seven Years' War and Sixty Years' War]
Battle of Pointe-aux-Trembles – 1760 – Conquest of New France (1758–1760) (French and Indian War) [Seven Years' War and Sixty Years' War]
Sainte-Thérèse Raid – 1760 – Conquest of New France (1758–1760) (French and Indian War) [Seven Years' War and Sixty Years' War]
Battle of Restigouche – 1760 – French and Indian War (Seven Years' War and Sixty Years' War)
Battle of the Thousand Islands – 1760 – Conquest of New France (1758–1760) (French and Indian War) [Seven Years' War and Sixty Years' War]
Battle of Signal Hill – 1762 – French and Indian War (Seven Years' War and Sixty Years' War)
Battle of Point Pelee – 1763 – Pontiac's War (American Indian Wars)
Raid on St. John (1775) – 1775 – American Revolutionary War
Siege of Fort St. Jean – 1775 – American Revolutionary War
Battle of Longue-Pointe – 1775 – American Revolutionary War
Raid on Charlottetown (1775) – 1775 – American Revolutionary War
Raid on Yarmouth, Nova Scotia (1775) – 1775 – American Revolutionary War
Battle of Quebec (1775) – 1775 – American Revolutionary War
Battle of Saint-Pierre – 1776 – American Revolutionary War
Battle of the Cedars – 1776 – American Revolutionary War
Battle of Trois-Rivières – 1776 – American Revolutionary War
Raid on Canso (1776) – 1776 – American Revolutionary War
Battle of Fort Cumberland (1776) – 1776 – American Revolutionary War
Battle off Yarmouth (1777) – 1777 – American Revolutionary War
Siege of Saint John (1777) – 1777 – American Revolutionary War
Capture of USS Hancock – 1777 – American Revolutionary War
Battle off Liverpool, Nova Scotia (1778) – 1778 – American Revolutionary War
Battle off Halifax (1780) – 1780 – American Revolutionary War
Battle of Blomindon – 1781 – American Revolutionary War
Action of 21 July 1781 – 1781 – American Revolutionary War
Raid on Annapolis Royal (1781) – 1781 – American Revolutionary War
Battle off Halifax (1782) – 1782 – American Revolutionary War
Raid on Chester, Nova Scotia – 1782 – American Revolutionary War
Raid on Lunenburg, Nova Scotia (1782) – 1782 – American Revolutionary War
Hudson Bay expedition – 1782 – American Revolutionary War
Battle of River Canard – 1812 – War of 1812 (Sixty Years' War)
Battle of Matilda – 1812 – War of 1812 (Sixty Years' War)
Raid on Gananoque – 1812 – War of 1812 (Sixty Years' War)
Capture of HMS Caledonia and HMS Detroit – 1812 – War of 1812 (Sixty Years' War)
Battle of Queenston Heights – 1812 – War of 1812 (Sixty Years' War)
Battle of St. Regis – 1812 – War of 1812 (Sixty Years' War)
Battle of Lacolle Mills (1812) – 1812 – War of 1812 (Sixty Years' War)
Battle of Frenchman's Creek – 1812 – War of 1812 (Sixty Years' War)
Raid on Elizabethtown – 1813 – War of 1812 (Sixty Years' War)
Battle of York – 1813 – War of 1812 (Sixty Years' War)
Battle of Fort George – 1813 – War of 1812 (Sixty Years' War)
Battle of Stoney Creek – 1813 – War of 1812 (Sixty Years' War)
Battle of Beaver Dams – 1813 – War of 1812 (Sixty Years' War)
Battle of Ball's Farm – 1813 – War of 1812 (Sixty Years' War)
Battle of the Thames – 1813 – Tecumseh's War (War of 1812 and American Indian Wars) [Sixty Years' War]
Battle of the Chateauguay – 1813 – War of 1812 (Sixty Years' War)
Battle of Crysler's Farm – 1813 – War of 1812 (Sixty Years' War)
Battle of Longwoods – 1814 – War of 1812 (Sixty Years' War)
Battle of Lacolle Mills (1814) – 1814 – War of 1812 (Sixty Years' War)
Raid on Port Dover – 1814 – War of 1812 (Sixty Years' War)
Capture of Fort Erie – 1814 – War of 1812 (Sixty Years' War)
Battle of Chippawa – 1814 – War of 1812 (Sixty Years' War)
Battle of Lundy's Lane – 1814 – War of 1812 (Sixty Years' War)
Siege of Fort Erie – 1814 – War of 1812 (Sixty Years' War)
Engagements on Lake Ontario – 1814 – War of 1812 (Sixty Years' War)
Battle of Cook's Mills – 1814 – War of 1812 (Sixty Years' War)
Battle of Malcolm's Mills – 1814 – War of 1812 (Sixty Years' War)
Battle of Seven Oaks – 1816 – Pemmican War
Battle of Saint-Denis (1837) – 1837 – Lower Canada Rebellion (Rebellions of 1837–1838)
Battle of Saint-Charles – 1837 – Lower Canada Rebellion (Rebellions of 1837–1838)
Battle of Montgomery's Tavern – 1837 – Upper Canada Rebellion (Rebellions of 1837–1838)
Battle of Saint-Eustache – 1837 – Lower Canada Rebellion (Rebellions of 1837–1838)
Battle of Pelee Island – 1838 – Upper Canada Rebellion (Rebellions of 1837–1838)
Raid on Short Hills – 1838 – Upper Canada Rebellion (Rebellions of 1837–1838)
Battle of Lacolle (1838) – 1838 – Lower Canada Rebellion (Rebellions of 1837–1838)
Battle of Baker's Farm – 1838 – Lower Canada Rebellion (Rebellions of 1837–1838)
Battle of Odelltown – 1838 – Lower Canada Rebellion (Rebellions of 1837–1838)
Battle of Beauharnois – 1838 – Lower Canada Rebellion (Rebellions of 1837–1838)
Battle of the Windmill – 1838 – Patriot War and Upper Canada Rebellion (Rebellions of 1837–1838)

1838 Aroostook War
1838 Nicola's War
1849 Courthouse Rebellion
1849 Montreal Riots
1849 Stony Monday Riot
1858 Fraser Canyon Gold Rush skirmishes along the Okanagan Trail
1858 Fraser Canyon War
1859 McGowan's War
1859 Pig War
1863 Lamalcha War
1864 Chilcotin War
1864 Kingfisher Incident
1866–1871 Fenian Raids
1866 Battle of Ridgeway
1866 Battle of Fort Erie
1866 Battle of Pigeon Hill
1870 Battle of Eccles Hill
1870 Battle of Trout River
1867 Grouse Creek War
1869–1870 Red River Rebellion
1870 Wolseley Expedition
1870 Battle of the Belly River
1873 Cypress Hills Massacre
1885 North-West Rebellion
1885 Battle of Duck Lake
1885 Frog Lake Massacre
1885 Battle of Fort Pitt
1885 Battle of Fish Creek
1885 Battle of Cut Knife
1885 Battle of Batoche
1885 Battle of Frenchman's Butte
1885 Battle of Loon Lake
1886 Anti-Chinese Riots
1887 Wild Horse Creek War

20th century
1902 – June 22: Toronto Streetcar Strike riot
1907 – Anti-Oriental Riots (Vancouver)
1913 – Vancouver Island War
1918 – Conscription Crisis of 1917
1918 – Vancouver General Strike
1919 – Winnipeg general strike
1925 – New Waterford Rebellion. See Davis Day.
1926 – Regina Riots
1933 – August 16: Christie Pits riot in Toronto.
1935 – The On-to-Ottawa Trek and Regina Riot.
1935 – The Battle of Ballantyne Pier
1938 – Bloody Sunday
1939–1945 Second World War
1939–1945 Battle of the Atlantic
1942–1944 Battle of the St. Lawrence
1942 – Bombardment of Estevan Point lighthouse
1944 – Terrace Mutiny
1945 – Halifax Riot on Victory in Europe Day.
1955 – Richard Riot
1963–1971 – Quebec separatist insurgency
1967 – Yorkville, Toronto summer street sit-ins and "riots".
1969 – Murray-Hill riot
1970 – October Crisis
1971 – Gastown Riots
1982 – October 14: The Squamish Five, bombs a Litton Industries factory.
1983 – Solidarity Crisis
1985 – June 23: Air India flight 182
1990 – July 11 to September 26: Oka Crisis
1990–1992 – Strike, strike-breaking, and bombing at Royal Oak Mines in Yellowknife, NWT
1993 – June 9: Montreal Stanley Cup Riot
1994 – June 14: Vancouver Stanley Cup Riot
1995 – Gustafsen Lake Standoff
1995 – Ipperwash Crisis
1997–2000 Wiebo Ludwig and his followers bomb wellheads in Alberta's oil country

21st century
2006 – February 28 to present: Caledonia land dispute
2009 – 2009 Vancouver gang war
2011 – June 15: 2011 Vancouver Stanley Cup riot
2012 – 2012 Quebec student protests

Cape Verde 

 Capture of Santiago (1585) – 1585 – Anglo-Spanish War (1585–1604)
 Battle of Porto Praya – 1781 – American Revolutionary War

Chile
 Battle of the Maule – c. between 1471-1493 or 1532– Inca Empire wars of conquest
 Battle of Reynogüelén – 1536 
 Battle of Quilacura – 1546 – Arauco War
 Battle of Andalien – 1550 – Arauco War
 Battle of Penco – 1550 – Arauco War
 Battle of Tucapel – 1553 – Arauco War
 Battle of Marihueñu – 1554 – Arauco War
 Battle of Peteroa – 1556 – Arauco War
 Battle of Mataquito – 1557 – Arauco War
 Battle of Curalaba – 1598 – Arauco War

Chilean War of Independence
 Battle of Yerbas Buenas – 1813
 Battle of San Carlos (1813) – 1813
 Siege of Chillán – 1813
 Battle of El Roble – 1813
 Battle of Talca (1814) – 1814
 Battle of El Quilo – 1814
 Battle of Membrillar – 1814
 Battle of Valparaíso – 1814 – War of 1812 (Sixty Years' War)
 Battle of Cancha Rayada (1814) – 1814
 Battle of Quechereguas (1814) – 1814
 Battle of Las Tres Acequias – 1814
 Battle of Rancagua – 1814
 Battle of Chacabuco – 1817
 Battle of Curapalihue – 1817
 Battle of Cancha Rayada (1818) – 1818
 Battle of Maipú – 1818
 Battle of Mesamávida – 1819
 Battle of Píleo – 1819
 Capture of Valdivia – 1820
 Battle of Agüi – 1820
 Battle of El Toro – 1820
 Battle of Tarpellanca – 1820
 Battle of Mocopulli – 1824
 Battle of Pudeto – 1826
 Battle of Bellavista – 1826

1830 and onwards
 Battle of Lircay – 1830 – Chilean Civil War of 1829–1830
 Battle of Loncomilla – 1851 – 1851 Chilean Revolution
 Battle of Papudo – 1865 – Chincha Islands War
 Battle of Abtao – 1866 – Chincha Islands War
 Battle of Iquique – 1879 – War of the Pacific
 Battle of Punta Gruesa – 1879 – War of the Pacific
 Battle of Angamos – 1879 – War of the Pacific
 Battle of Pisagua – 1879 – War of the Pacific
 Battle of San Francisco – 1879 – War of the Pacific
 Battle of Tarapacá – 1879 – War of the Pacific
 Battle of Arica – 1880 – War of the Pacific
 Battle of Pozo Almonte – 1891 – Chilean Civil War of 1891
 Battle of Concón – 1891 – Chilean Civil War of 1891
 Battle of Placilla – 1891 – Chilean Civil War of 1891
 Battle of Coronel – 1914 – World War I

China
 Battle of Mingtiao – c. 1600 BC – Tang of Shang's revolution
 Battle of Muye – c. 1046 BC – Fall of the Shang dynasty
 Battle of Lize – 478 BC – Warring States period
 Battle of Maling – 342 BC – Warring States period
 Battle of Changping – 262 BC – 260 BC – Warring States period
 Battle of Fei (233 BCE) – 233 BC – Qin's wars of unification (Warring States period)
 Battle of Julu – 207 BC – Chu–Han Contention
 Battle of Pengcheng – 205 BC – Chu–Han Contention
 Battle of Anyi – 205 BC – Chu–Han Contention
 Battle of Jingxing – 205 BC – Chu–Han Contention
 Battle of Wei River – 204 BC – Chu–Han Contention
 Battle of Gaixia – 203 BC – Chu–Han Contention
 Battle of Baideng – 200 BC
 Battle of Mayi – 133 BC – Han–Xiongnu War
 Battle of Loulan – 108 BC – Han–Xiongnu War
 Battle of Tian Shan – 99 BC – Han–Xiongnu War
 Battle of Jushi – 67 BC – Han–Xiongnu War
 Battle of Kunyang – 23 AD – Lülin Rebellion
 Battle of Yiwulu – 73 – Han–Xiongnu War
 Battle of Xingyang (190) – 190 – Campaign against Dong Zhuo

End of the Han dynasty

Three Kingdoms

4th century onwards

20th century onwards

Colombia
 Battle of Punta Quemada – 1525 – Spanish conquest of the Inca Empire
 Battle of Cartagena de Indias (1586) – 1586 – Anglo-Spanish War (1585–1604)
 Raid on Cartagena de Indias (1697) – 1697 – Nine Years' War
 Action of August 1702 – 1702 – War of the Spanish Succession
 Wager's Action – 1708 – War of the Spanish Succession
 Capture of the galleon San Joaquin or Battle of Cartagena – 1710 – War of the Spanish Succession
 Battle of Cartagena de Indias – 1741 – War of Jenkins' Ear (War of the Austrian Succession)
 Battle of Cúcuta – 1813 – Admirable Campaign (Venezuelan War of Independence)
 Los Andes vs Prueba – 1820 – Chilean War of Independence (Spanish American wars of independence)

Democratic Republic of the Congo 
 Siege of Jadotville – 1961
 Second Battle for the Tunnel – 1961

Costa Rica 
 Raid on Matina – 1747 – War of Jenkins' Ear (War of the Austrian Succession)
 Battle of Santa Rosa – 1856

Croatia
 Siege of Issa – 230 BC – 229 BC – First Illyrian War
 Siege of Curicta – 49 BC – Caesar's civil war
 Battle of Cibalae – 316 – Civil wars of the Tetrarchy
 Battle of Mursa Major – 351 – Roman civil war of 350–353
 Battle of Save – 388
 Battle of Nedao – 454 – Germanic–Hunnic Wars
 Battle of Scardon – c. 535 or 536 – Gothic War (535–554)
 Siege of Trsat – 799 – Frankish campaign against Avars and Slavs
 Battle of Kupa – 819
 Siege of Ragusa (866–868) – 866 – 868 – Arab–Byzantine wars
 Croatian–Bulgarian battle of 926 or Battle of the Bosnian Highlands – 926 – Croatian–Bulgarian wars
 Battle of Gvozd Mountain – 1097 – Croatian–Hungarian War of 1097
 Siege of Zara – 1202 – Fourth Crusade (Crusades)
 Battle of Grobnik field – 1242 – Mongol invasion of Europe
 Battle of Bliska – 1322 – Dynastic-feudal struggle for supremacy in Croatia
 Battle of Traù – 1378 – War of Chioggia (Venetian–Genoese wars)
 Battle of Pola – 1379 – War of Chioggia (Venetian–Genoese wars)
 Battle of Vrpile – 1491 – Hundred Years' Croatian–Ottoman War (Croatian–Ottoman wars, Ottoman–Hungarian wars and Ottoman–Habsburg wars) [Ottoman wars in Europe]
 Battle of Krbava Field – 1493 – Hundred Years' Croatian–Ottoman War (Croatian–Ottoman wars, Ottoman–Hungarian wars and Ottoman–Habsburg wars) [Ottoman wars in Europe]
 Battle of Dubica – 1513 – Hundred Years' Croatian–Ottoman War (Croatian–Ottoman wars, Ottoman–Hungarian wars and Ottoman–Habsburg wars) [Ottoman wars in Europe]
 Siege of Knin – 1522 – Hundred Years' Croatian–Ottoman War (Croatian–Ottoman wars, Ottoman–Hungarian wars and Ottoman–Habsburg wars) [Ottoman wars in Europe]
 Siege of Klis – 1536 – 1537 – Hundred Years' Croatian–Ottoman War (Croatian–Ottoman wars, Ottoman–Hungarian wars and Ottoman–Habsburg wars) [Ottoman wars in Europe]
 Battle of Gorjani or Battle of Đakovo – 1537 – Katzianer's Campaign (Hundred Years' Croatian–Ottoman War) and Habsburg–Ottoman wars in Hungary (1526–1568) [Croatian–Ottoman wars, Ottoman–Hungarian wars and Ottoman–Habsburg wars] [Ottoman wars in Europe]
 Siege of Valpovo – 1543 – Habsburg–Ottoman wars in Hungary (1526–1568) (Ottoman–Habsburg wars) [Ottoman wars in Europe]
 Battle of Hrastovica (1561) – 1561 – Hundred Years' Croatian–Ottoman War (Croatian–Ottoman wars, Ottoman–Hungarian wars and Ottoman–Habsburg wars) [Ottoman wars in Europe]
 Battle of Obreška – 1565 – Hundred Years' Croatian–Ottoman War (Croatian–Ottoman wars, Ottoman–Hungarian wars and Ottoman–Habsburg wars) [Ottoman wars in Europe]
 Siege of Gvozdansko – 1577 – 1578 – Hundred Years' Croatian–Ottoman War (Croatian–Ottoman wars, Ottoman–Hungarian wars and Ottoman–Habsburg wars) [Ottoman wars in Europe]
 Battle of Slunj – 1584 – Hundred Years' Croatian–Ottoman War (Croatian–Ottoman wars, Ottoman–Hungarian wars and Ottoman–Habsburg wars) [Ottoman wars in Europe]
 Battle of Brest (1592) – 1592 – Hundred Years' Croatian–Ottoman War (Croatian–Ottoman wars, Ottoman–Hungarian wars and Ottoman–Habsburg wars) [Ottoman wars in Europe]
 Battle of Sisak – 1593 – Hundred Years' Croatian–Ottoman War and Long Turkish War (Croatian–Ottoman wars, Ottoman–Hungarian wars and Ottoman–Habsburg wars) [Ottoman wars in Europe]
 Battle of Brest (1596) – 1596 – Hundred Years' Croatian–Ottoman War (Croatian–Ottoman wars, Ottoman–Hungarian wars and Ottoman–Habsburg wars) [Ottoman wars in Europe]
 First Battle of Zrínyiújvár – 1663 – Austro-Turkish War (1663–1664) (Ottoman–Habsburg wars) [Ottoman wars in Europe]
 Second Battle of Zrínyiújvár – 1663 – Austro-Turkish War (1663–1664) (Ottoman–Habsburg wars) [Ottoman wars in Europe]
 Siege of Novi Zrin (1664) – 1664 – Austro-Turkish War (1663–1664) (Croatian–Ottoman wars, Ottoman–Hungarian wars and Ottoman–Habsburg wars) [Ottoman wars in Europe]
 Siege of Virovitica (1684) – 1684 – Croatian-Slavonian-Dalmatian theater in Great Turkish War (Great Turkish War)
 Battle of Slankamen – 1691
 Relief of Cetingrad – 1790 – Austro-Turkish War (1788–1791)
 Battle of Lissa (1811) – 1811 – Adriatic campaign of 1807–1814 (Napoleonic Wars)
 Action of 29 November 1811 – 1811 – Adriatic campaign of 1807–1814 (Napoleonic Wars)
 Battle of Lippa – 1813 – War of the Sixth Coalition (Napoleonic Wars)
 Siege of Zara (1813) – 1813 – War of the Sixth Coalition and Adriatic campaign of 1807–1814 (Napoleonic Wars)
 Siege of Ragusa – 1814 – War of the Sixth Coalition and Adriatic campaign of 1807–1814 (Napoleonic Wars)
 Battle of Vis – 1866
 Battle of Vukovar – 1991
 Siege of Dubrovnik – 1991
 Operation Maslenica – 1993
 Operation Flash – 1995
 Operation Storm – 1995

Cuba 

 Battle of Pinos – 1596 – Anglo-Spanish War (1585–1604)
 Raid on Santiago de Cuba (1603) – 1603 – Anglo-Spanish War (1585–1604)
 Battle in the Bay of Matanzas – 1628 – Eighty Years' War, 1621–1648 (Eighty Years' War and Thirty Years' War) [European wars of religion]
 Invasion of Cuba (1741) – 1741 – War of Jenkins' Ear (War of the Austrian Succession)
 Battle of Santiago de Cuba (1748) – 1748 – War of Jenkins' Ear (War of the Austrian Succession)
 Battle of Havana (1748) – 1748 – War of Jenkins' Ear (War of the Austrian Succession)
 Battle of the Windward Passage – 1760 – Seven Years' War
 Siege of Havana – 1762 – Anglo-Spanish War (1762–1763) (Seven Years' War)
 Action of 17 February 1783 – 1783 – American Revolutionary War
 Action of 23 August 1806 – 1806 – Anglo-Spanish War (1796–1808) (French Revolutionary and Napoleonic Wars)

Cyprus 
 Battle of Salamis (306 BC) – 306 BC – Fourth War of the Diadochi
 Battle of Keramaia – 746 – Arab–Byzantine wars
 Siege of Famagusta – 1570 – 1571 – Ottoman–Venetian War (1570–1573) (Ottoman–Venetian wars)

Czech Republic
 Battle of Loděnice (1179) – 1179

Hussite Wars
 Battle of Vyšehrad – 1419
 Battle of Živohoště – 1419
 Battle of Nekmíř – 1419
 Battle of Sudoměř – 1420
 Battle of Vítkov Hill – 1420
 Battle of Tábor – 1420
 Battle of Brüx – 1421
 Battle of Kutná Hora – 1421
 Battle of Nebovidy – 1422
 Battle of Deutschbrod – 1422
 Battle of Hořice – 1423
 Battle of Aussig – 1426
 Battle of Tachov – 1427
 Battle of Kratzau – 1428
 Battle of Domažlice – 1431
 Siege of Pilsen (1433–1434) – 1433 – 1434
 Battle of Lipany or Battle of Český Brod – 1434
 Battle of Kretsch – 1435
 Battle of Sellnitz – 1438

17th century onwards
 Siege of Pilsen or Siege of Plzeň – 1618 – Bohemian Revolt (Thirty Years' War)
 Battle of Lomnice or Battle of Lomnice nad Lužnicí – 1618 – Bohemian Revolt (Thirty Years' War)
 Battle of Sablat or Battle of Záblatí – 1619 – Bohemian Revolt (Thirty Years' War)
 Battle of Wisternitz or Battle of Dolní Věstonice – 1619 – Bohemian Revolt (Thirty Years' War)
 Battle of White Mountain – 1620 – Bohemian Revolt (Thirty Years' War)
 Battle of Neu Titschein – 1621 – Bohemian Revolt (Thirty Years' War)
 Battle of Preßnitz – 1641 – Thirty Years' War
 Battle of Jankau – 1645 – Thirty Years' War
 Battle of Triebl – 1647 – Thirty Years' War
 Battle of Prague (1648) – 1648 – Thirty Years' War
 Battle of Prague (1741) – 1741 – War of the Austrian Succession
 Battle of Chotusitz – 1742 – First Silesian War (War of the Austrian Succession and Silesian Wars)
 Battle of Sahay – 1742 – War of the Austrian Succession
 Siege of Prague (1742) – 1742 – War of the Austrian Succession
 Battle of Soor – 1745 – Second Silesian War (War of the Austrian Succession and Silesian Wars)
 Battle of Lobositz – 1756 – Third Silesian War (Seven Years' War)
 Battle of Reichenberg – 1757 – Third Silesian War (Seven Years' War)
 Battle of Prague – 1757 – Third Silesian War (Seven Years' War)
 Siege of Prague – 1757 – Third Silesian War (Seven Years' War)
 Battle of Kolín – 1757 – Third Silesian War (Seven Years' War)
 Siege of Olomouc – 1758 – Third Silesian War (Seven Years' War)
 Battle of Domstadtl – 1758 – Third Silesian War (Seven Years' War)
 Battle of Peterswalde – 1759 – Third Silesian War (Seven Years' War)
 Battle of Wischau – 1805 – War of the Third Coalition (Napoleonic Wars)
 Battle of Austerlitz – 1805 – War of the Third Coalition (Napoleonic Wars)
 Battle of Znaim – 1809 – War of the Fifth Coalition (Napoleonic Wars)
 Battle of Kulm – 1813 – German campaign of 1813 (War of the Sixth Coalition) [Napoleonic Wars]
 Second Battle of Kulm – 1813 – German campaign of 1813 (War of the Sixth Coalition) [Napoleonic Wars]
 Battle of Königgrätz (also Battle of Sadová) – 1866
 Prague Offensive – 1945

Denmark
 Battle of Jellinge Heath – 1131 – Danish Civil Wars
 Siege of Schleswig – 1132 – Danish Civil Wars
 Battle of Sejerø – 1132 – Danish Civil Wars
 Battle of Værebro – 1133 – Danish Civil Wars
 Battle of Grathe Heath – 1157 – Danish Civil Wars
 Battle of Copenhagen (1289) – 1289 – War of the Outlaws
 Battle of Skanör – 1289 – War of the Outlaws
 Bombardment of Copenhagen (1428) – 1428 – Dano-Hanseatic War (1426–1435)
 Battle of Bornholm (1457) – 1457 – Thirteen Years' War (1454–1466) (Polish–Teutonic War)
 Battle of Bornholm (1535) – 1535 – Count's Feud (European wars of religion)
 Battle of Little Belt – 1535 – Count's Feud (European wars of religion)
 Battle of Bornholm (1563) – 1563 – Northern Seven Years' War (Dano-Swedish War and Polish–Swedish wars)
 Action of 4 June 1565 – 1565 – Northern Seven Years' War (Dano-Swedish War and Polish–Swedish wars)
 Action of 7 July 1565 – 1565 – Northern Seven Years' War (Dano-Swedish War and Polish–Swedish wars)
 Battle of Kolding (1644) – 1644 – Torstenson War (Thirty Years' War)
 Action of 16 May 1644 – 1644 – Torstenson War (Thirty Years' War)
 Battle of Møn (1657) – 1657 – Dano-Swedish War (1657–1658) (Second Northern War) [Northern Wars]
 Battle of the Sound – 1658 – Second Northern War (Northern Wars)
 Siege of Kolding (1658) – 1658 – Second Northern War (Northern Wars)
 Assault on Copenhagen (1659) – 1659 – Second Northern War (Northern Wars)
 Battle of Ebeltoft – 1659 – Second Northern War (Northern Wars)
 Battle of Nyborg – 1659 – Second Northern War (Northern Wars)
 Battle of Bornholm (1676) – 1676 – Scanian War (Franco-Dutch War and Northern Wars)
 Battle of Møn – 1677 – Scanian War (Franco-Dutch War and Northern Wars)
 Battle of Køge Bay (1677) – 1677 – Scanian War (Franco-Dutch War and Northern Wars)
 Landing at Humlebæk – 1700 – Great Northern War (Northern Wars)
 Battle of Køge Bay (1710) – 1710 – Great Northern War (Northern Wars)
 Battle of Fladstrand – 1712 – Great Northern War (Northern Wars)
 Battle of Fehmarn (1715) – 1715 – Great Northern War (Northern Wars)
 Battle of Copenhagen – 1801 – War of the Second Coalition (French Revolutionary Wars)
 Battle of Copenhagen (1807) – 1807 – Gunboat War
 Battle of Køge – 1807 – Gunboat War
 Battle of Zealand Point – 1808 – Gunboat War
 Battle of Saltholm – 1808 – Gunboat War
 Battle of Anholt – 1811 – Gunboat War
 Battle of Nybøl  – 1848
 Battle of Dybbøl (1848)
 Battle of Kolding (1849)
 Skirmish of Århus – 1849
 Battle of Fredericia – 1849
 Battle of Mysunde – 1864
 Battle of Als – 1864
 Battle of Dybbøl – 1864

Djibouti 

 Battle of Bab al-Mandab – 1551 – Ottoman–Portuguese conflicts (1538–1559) (Ottoman–Portuguese confrontations)

Dominica 

 Invasion of Dominica (1761) – 1761 – Seven Years' War
 Invasion of Dominica (1778) – 1778 – American Revolutionary War
 Battle of the Saintes – 1782 – American Revolutionary War
 USS Enterprise vs Flambeau – 1800 – Quasi-War (French Revolutionary Wars)

Dominican Republic 

 Battle of Santo Domingo (1586) – 1586 – Anglo-Spanish War (1585–1604)
 Siege of Santo Domingo (1655) – 1655 – Anglo-Spanish War (1654–1660) (Franco-Spanish War (1635–1659)) [Thirty Years' War]
 Battle of the Mona Passage – 1782 – American Revolutionary War
 Action of 18 October 1782 – 1782 – American Revolutionary War
 Battle of Puerto Plata Harbor – 1800 – Quasi-War (French Revolutionary Wars)
 Battle of Palo Hincado – 1808 – Spanish reconquest of Santo Domingo (Napoleonic Wars)

East Timor/Timor-Leste
 Battle of Aidabasalala – 1999 – 1999 East Timorese crisis

Ecuador 

 Battle of Mullihambato – 1531 – Inca Civil War
 Battle of Puná – 1531 – Spanish conquest of the Inca Empire
 Battle of Chimborazo – 1532 – Inca Civil War
 Battle of Tumebamba – 1532 – Inca Civil War
 Battle of Mount Chimborazo – 1534 – Spanish conquest of the Inca Empire
 Battle of Iñaquito – 1546 – Spanish conquest of the Inca Empire
 Action of San Mateo Bay – 1594 – Anglo-Spanish War (1585–1604)
 Action off James Island – 1813 – War of 1812 (Sixty Years' War)
 Action off Charles Island – 1813 – War of 1812 (Sixty Years' War)
 Battle of Pichincha – 1822 – Ecuadorian War of Independence (Spanish American wars of independence)
 Battle of Cruces – 1828 – Gran Colombia–Peru War
 Battle of Tarqui – 1829 – Gran Colombia–Peru War

Egypt

 Battle of the Delta – c. between 1179 BC and 1175 BC – Late Bronze Age collapse
 Battle of Bitter Lakes – 925 BC – Jeroboam's Revolt
 Battle of Pelusium – 525 BC
 Siege of Alexandria (47 BC) – 47 BC – Alexandrian war (Caesar's civil war)
 Battle of the Nile (47 BC) – 47 BC – Alexandrian war (Caesar's civil war)
 Battle of Heliopolis – 640 – Muslim conquest of Egypt (Arab–Byzantine wars)
 Siege of Babylon Fortress – 640 – Muslim conquest of Egypt (Arab–Byzantine wars)
 Siege of Alexandria (641) – Muslim conquest of Egypt (Arab–Byzantine wars)
 Battle of Nikiou – 646 – Muslim conquest of Egypt (Arab–Byzantine wars)
 Sack of Damietta (853) – 853 – Arab–Byzantine wars
 Battle of al-Babein – 1167 – Crusades
 Siege of Damietta (1218–1219) – 1218 – 1219 – Fifth Crusade (Crusades)
 Siege of Damietta (1249) – 1249 – Seventh Crusade (Crusades)
 Battle of Mansurah (1250) – 1250 – Seventh Crusade (Crusades)
 Battle of Fariskur – 1250 – Seventh Crusade (Crusades)
 Battle of Ridaniya – 1517 – Ottoman–Mamluk War (1516–1517) (Ottoman wars in Asia)
 Capture of Cairo (1517) – 1517 – Ottoman–Mamluk War (1516–1517) (Ottoman wars in Asia)
 Battle of El Tor – 1541 – Ottoman–Portuguese conflicts (1538–1559) (Ottoman–Portuguese confrontations)
 Battle of Suez (1541) – 1541 – Ottoman–Portuguese conflicts (1538–1559) (Ottoman–Portuguese confrontations)
 Battle of Shubra Khit – 1798 – French campaign in Egypt and Syria (War of the Second Coalition) [French Revolutionary Wars]
 Battle of the Pyramids – 1798 – French campaign in Egypt and Syria (War of the Second Coalition) [French Revolutionary Wars]
 Battle of the Nile – 1798 – Mediterranean campaign of 1798 and French campaign in Egypt and Syria (War of the Second Coalition) [French Revolutionary Wars]
 Siege of El Arish – 1799 – French campaign in Egypt and Syria (War of the Second Coalition) [French Revolutionary Wars]
 Battle of Abukir (1799) – 1799 – French campaign in Egypt and Syria (War of the Second Coalition) [French Revolutionary Wars]
 Battle of Heliopolis (1800) – 1800 – French campaign in Egypt and Syria (War of the Second Coalition) [French Revolutionary Wars]
 Battle of Abukir (1801) – 1801 – French campaign in Egypt and Syria (War of the Second Coalition) [French Revolutionary Wars]
 Battle of Mandora – 1801 – French campaign in Egypt and Syria (War of the Second Coalition) [French Revolutionary Wars]
 Battle of Alexandria (1801) – 1801 – French campaign in Egypt and Syria (War of the Second Coalition) [French Revolutionary Wars]
 Siege of Fort Julien – 1801 – French campaign in Egypt and Syria (War of the Second Coalition) [French Revolutionary Wars]
 Siege of Cairo – 1801 – French campaign in Egypt and Syria (War of the Second Coalition) [French Revolutionary Wars]
 Siege of Alexandria (1801) – 1801 – French campaign in Egypt and Syria (War of the Second Coalition) [French Revolutionary Wars]
 Greek raid on Alexandria (1825) – 1825 – Greek War of Independence
 Battle of Kafr-el-Dawwar – 1882 – Ahmed Urabi defeated British forces.
 Battle of Tel al-Kebir – 1882 – Defeat of Urabi by British
 Battle of Gazala – 1942 – Axis attack on British Forces around Tobruk
 Battle of Alam Halfa – 1942 – Axis attack on British Forces around El Alamein
 Battle of El Alamein – 1942 – Allied attack on Axis Forces
 Battle of Kasserine Pass – 1942 – Axis attack on Allied Forces (USA) on Tunisia

England
 Battle of the Medway – 43 – Roman conquest of Britain
 Caratacus's last battle – 50 – Roman conquest of Britain
 Defeat of Boudica – 60 or 61 – Boudican revolt

Anglo-Saxon settlement of Britain

Viking activity in the British Isles

Norman Conquest and onwards
 Battle of Hastings – 1066 – Norman Conquest
 Harrying of the North – 1069 – Norman Conquest
 Battle of Alnwick (1093) – 1093 – Malcolm III of Scotland invaded England
 Siege of Wark (1138) – 1138 – The Anarchy
 Battle of Clitheroe – 1138 – The Anarchy
 Battle of the Standard – 1138 – The Anarchy
 Battle of Lincoln (1141) – 1141 – The Anarchy
 Rout of Winchester – 1141 – The Anarchy
 Siege of Oxford (1142) – 1142 – The Anarchy
 Battle of Wilton – 1143 – The Anarchy
 Battle of Alnwick (1174) – 1174 – Revolt of 1173–1174
 Battle of Lincoln (1217) – 1217 – First Barons' War
 Battle of Sandwich (1217) – 1217 – First Barons' War
 Battle of Northampton (1264) – 1264 – Second Barons' War
 Battle of Lewes – 1264 – Second Barons' War
 Battle of Evesham – 1265 – Second Barons' War
 Battle of Chesterfield – 1266 – Second Barons' War
 Siege of Kenilworth – 1266 – Second Barons' War
 Sack of Berwick (1296) – 1296 – First War of Scottish Independence
 Siege of Carlisle (1315) – 1315 – First War of Scottish Independence
 Siege of Berwick (1318) – 1318 – First War of Scottish Independence
 Battle of Myton or Chapter of Myton or The White Battle – 1319 – First War of Scottish Independence
 Battle of Burton Bridge – 1322 – Despenser War
 Battle of Boroughbridge – 1322 – Despenser War
 Battle of Old Byland or Battle of Byland Alley or Battle of Byland Moor or Battle of Scotch Corner – 1322 – First War of Scottish Independence
 Battle of Stanhope Park – 1327 – First War of Scottish Independence
 Siege of Berwick (1333) – 1333 – Second War of Scottish Independence
 Battle of Halidon Hill – 1333 – Second War of Scottish Independence
 Battle of Neville's Cross – 1346 – Second War of Scottish Independence and Edwardian Phase (Hundred Years' War)
 Battle of Winchelsea – 1350 – Edwardian Phase (Hundred Years' War)
 Sieges of Berwick (1355 and 1356) – 1355 – 1356 – Second War of Scottish Independence
 Battle of Otterburn – 1388 – Anglo-Scottish Wars
 Battle of Homildon Hill or Battle of Holmedon Hill – 1402 – Anglo-Scottish Wars
 Battle of Shrewsbury – 1403 – Welsh Revolt
 Battle of Yeavering – 1415 – Anglo-Scottish Wars

Wars of the Roses

16th century and beyond
 Battle of Deptford Bridge – 1497 – Cornish rebellion of 1497
 Battle of Flodden or Battle of Flodden Field or Battle of Branxton – 1513 – War of the League of Cambrai (Italian Wars) and Anglo-Scottish Wars
 Battle of Solway Moss – 1542 – Anglo-Scottish Wars
 Battle of the Solent – 1545 – Italian War of 1542–1546 (Italian Wars)
 French invasion of the Isle of Wight – 1545 – Italian War of 1542–1546 (Italian Wars)
 Battle of Bonchurch – 1545 – Italian War of 1542–1546 (Italian Wars)
 Raid of the Redeswire – 1575 – Anglo-Scottish Wars
 Raid on Mount's Bay – 1595 – Anglo-Spanish War (1585–1604)
 Attack on Cawsand – 1596 – Anglo-Spanish War (1585–1604)
 Battle of the Narrow Seas – 1602 – Anglo-Spanish War (1585–1604) and Eighty Years' War, 1599–1609 (Eighty Years' War) [European wars of religion]
 Battle off Lizard Point – 1637 – Eighty Years' War, 1621–1648 (Eighty Years' War and Thirty Years' War) [European wars of religion]
 Battle of the Downs – 1639 – Eighty Years' War, 1621–1648 (Eighty Years' War and Thirty Years' War) [European wars of religion]
 Battle of Newburn – 1640 – Second Bishops' War (Scotland in the Wars of the Three Kingdoms) [Wars of the Three Kingdoms]
 Siege of Hull (1642) – 1642 – First English Civil War, 1642 (First English Civil War) [Wars of the Three Kingdoms]
 Battle of Marshall's Elm – 1642 – First English Civil War, 1642 (First English Civil War) [Wars of the Three Kingdoms]
 Siege of Portsmouth – 1642 – First English Civil War, 1642 (First English Civil War) [Wars of the Three Kingdoms]
 Siege of Plymouth – 1642 – 1646 – First English Civil War, 1642 (First English Civil War) [Wars of the Three Kingdoms]
 Battle of Babylon Hill – 1642 – First English Civil War, 1642 (First English Civil War) [Wars of the Three Kingdoms]
 Battle of Powick Bridge – 1642 – First English Civil War, 1642 (First English Civil War) [Wars of the Three Kingdoms]
 Battle of Kings Norton – 1642 – First English Civil War, 1642 (First English Civil War) [Wars of the Three Kingdoms]
 Battle of Edgehill – 1642 – First English Civil War, 1642 (First English Civil War) [Wars of the Three Kingdoms]
 Battle of Aylesbury – 1642 – First English Civil War, 1642 (First English Civil War) [Wars of the Three Kingdoms]
 Battle of Brentford (1642) – 1642 – First English Civil War, 1642 (First English Civil War) [Wars of the Three Kingdoms]
 Battle of Turnham Green – 1642 – First English Civil War, 1642 (First English Civil War) [Wars of the Three Kingdoms]
 Storming of Farnham Castle – 1642 – First English Civil War, 1642 (First English Civil War) [Wars of the Three Kingdoms]
 Battle of Piercebridge – 1642 – First English Civil War, 1642 (First English Civil War) [Wars of the Three Kingdoms]
 Battle of Muster Green – 1642 – First English Civil War, 1642 (First English Civil War) [Wars of the Three Kingdoms]
 Battle of Tadcaster – 1642 – First English Civil War, 1642 (First English Civil War) [Wars of the Three Kingdoms]
 Siege of Exeter (1642) – 1642 – 1643 – First English Civil War, 1642 (First English Civil War) [Wars of the Three Kingdoms]
 First siege of Bradford – 1642 – First English Civil War, 1642 (First English Civil War) [Wars of the Three Kingdoms]
 Siege of Chichester – 1642 – First English Civil War, 1642 (First English Civil War) [Wars of the Three Kingdoms]
 Battle of Braddock Down – 1643 – First English Civil War, 1643 (First English Civil War) [Wars of the Three Kingdoms]
 Battle of Leeds – 1643 – First English Civil War, 1643 (First English Civil War) [Wars of the Three Kingdoms]
 First Battle of Middlewich – 1643 – First English Civil War, 1643 (First English Civil War) [Wars of the Three Kingdoms]
 Battle of Hopton Heath – 1643 – First English Civil War, 1643 (First English Civil War) [Wars of the Three Kingdoms]
 Battle of Seacroft Moor – 1643 – First English Civil War, 1643 (First English Civil War) [Wars of the Three Kingdoms]
 Battle of Camp Hill or Battle of Birmingham – 1643 – First English Civil War, 1643 (First English Civil War) [Wars of the Three Kingdoms]
 Siege of Lichfield – 1643 – First English Civil War, 1643 (First English Civil War) [Wars of the Three Kingdoms]
 Battle of Ripple Field – 1643 – First English Civil War, 1643 (First English Civil War) [Wars of the Three Kingdoms]
 Siege of Reading – 1643 – First English Civil War, 1643 (First English Civil War) [Wars of the Three Kingdoms]
 Battle of Sourton Down – 1643 – First English Civil War, 1643 (First English Civil War) [Wars of the Three Kingdoms]
 First siege of Wardour Castle – 1643 – First English Civil War, 1643 (First English Civil War) [Wars of the Three Kingdoms]
 Battle of Stratton – 1643 – First English Civil War, 1643 (First English Civil War) [Wars of the Three Kingdoms]
 Capture of Wakefield – 1643 – First English Civil War, 1643 (First English Civil War) [Wars of the Three Kingdoms]
 Siege of Worcester (1643) – 1643 – First English Civil War, 1643 (First English Civil War) [Wars of the Three Kingdoms]
 Battle of Chalgrove Field – 1643 – First English Civil War, 1643 (First English Civil War) [Wars of the Three Kingdoms]
 Battle of Adwalton Moor – 1643 – First English Civil War, 1643 (First English Civil War) [Wars of the Three Kingdoms]
 Second siege of Bradford – 1643 – First English Civil War, 1643 (First English Civil War) [Wars of the Three Kingdoms]
 Battle of Burton Bridge – 1643 – First English Civil War, 1643 (First English Civil War) [Wars of the Three Kingdoms]
 Battle of Lansdowne – 1643 – First English Civil War, 1643 (First English Civil War) [Wars of the Three Kingdoms]
 Battle of Roundway Down – 1643 – First English Civil War, 1643 (First English Civil War) [Wars of the Three Kingdoms]
 Storming of Bristol – 1643 – First English Civil War, 1643 (First English Civil War) [Wars of the Three Kingdoms]
 Battle of Gainsborough – 1643 – First English Civil War, 1643 (First English Civil War) [Wars of the Three Kingdoms]
 Siege of Gloucester – 1643 – First English Civil War, 1643 (First English Civil War) [Wars of the Three Kingdoms]
 Siege of Hull (1643) – 1643 – First English Civil War, 1643 (First English Civil War) [Wars of the Three Kingdoms]
 Battle of Aldbourne Chase – 1643 – First English Civil War, 1643 (First English Civil War) [Wars of the Three Kingdoms]
 First Battle of Newbury – 1643 – First English Civil War, 1643 (First English Civil War) [Wars of the Three Kingdoms]
 Battle of Winceby – 1643 – First English Civil War, 1643 (First English Civil War) [Wars of the Three Kingdoms]
 Battle of Olney Bridge – 1643 – First English Civil War, 1643 (First English Civil War) [Wars of the Three Kingdoms]
 First siege of Basing House – 1643 – First English Civil War, 1643 (First English Civil War) [Wars of the Three Kingdoms]
 Battle of Heptonstall – 1643 – First English Civil War, 1643 (First English Civil War) [Wars of the Three Kingdoms]
 Second siege of Wardour Castle – 1643 – 1644 – First English Civil War, 1643 (First English Civil War) [Wars of the Three Kingdoms]
 Battle of Alton – 1643 – First English Civil War, 1643 (First English Civil War) [Wars of the Three Kingdoms]
 Battle of Bramber Bridge – 1643 – First English Civil War, 1643 (First English Civil War) [Wars of the Three Kingdoms]
 Siege of Arundel – 1643 – 1644 – First English Civil War, 1643 (First English Civil War) [Wars of the Three Kingdoms]
 Second Battle of Middlewich – 1643 – First English Civil War, 1643 (First English Civil War) [Wars of the Three Kingdoms]
 Battle of Nantwich – 1644 – First English Civil War, 1644 (First English Civil War) [Wars of the Three Kingdoms]
 Siege of Newcastle – 1644 – First English Civil War, 1644 (First English Civil War) [Scotland in the Wars of the Three Kingdoms] [Wars of the Three Kingdoms]
 First siege of Lathom House – 1644 – First English Civil War, 1644 (First English Civil War) [Wars of the Three Kingdoms]
 Relief of Newark – 1644 – First English Civil War, 1644 (First English Civil War) [Wars of the Three Kingdoms]
 Battle of Boldon Hill – 1644 – First English Civil War, 1644 (First English Civil War) [Scotland in the Wars of the Three Kingdoms] [Wars of the Three Kingdoms]
 Battle of Stourbridge Heath – 1644 – First English Civil War, 1644 (First English Civil War) [Wars of the Three Kingdoms]
 Battle of Cheriton – 1644 – First English Civil War, 1644 (First English Civil War) [Wars of the Three Kingdoms]
 Battle of Selby – 1644 – First English Civil War, 1644 (First English Civil War) [Wars of the Three Kingdoms]
 Siege of Lyme Regis – 1644 – First English Civil War, 1644 (First English Civil War) [Wars of the Three Kingdoms]
 Siege of York – 1644 – First English Civil War, 1644 (First English Civil War) [Scotland in the Wars of the Three Kingdoms] [Wars of the Three Kingdoms]
 Siege of Lincoln – 1644 – First English Civil War, 1644 (First English Civil War) [Wars of the Three Kingdoms]
 First siege of Oxford – 1644 – First English Civil War, 1644 (First English Civil War) [Wars of the Three Kingdoms]
 Storming of Bolton – 1644 – First English Civil War, 1644 (First English Civil War) [Wars of the Three Kingdoms]
 Second siege of Basing House – 1644 – First English Civil War, 1644 (First English Civil War) [Wars of the Three Kingdoms]
 Battle of Tipton Green – 1644 – First English Civil War, 1644 (First English Civil War) [Wars of the Three Kingdoms]
 Battle of Oswestry – 1644 – First English Civil War, 1644 (First English Civil War) [Wars of the Three Kingdoms]
 Battle of Cropredy Bridge – 1644 – First English Civil War, 1644 (First English Civil War) [Wars of the Three Kingdoms]
 Battle of Marston Moor – 1644 – First English Civil War, 1644 (First English Civil War) [Scotland in the Wars of the Three Kingdoms] [Wars of the Three Kingdoms]
 Battle of Gunnislake New Bridge – 1644 – First English Civil War, 1644 (First English Civil War) [Wars of the Three Kingdoms]
 Battle of Ormskirk – 1644 – First English Civil War, 1644 (First English Civil War) [Wars of the Three Kingdoms]
 Battle of Lostwithiel – 1644 – First English Civil War, 1644 (First English Civil War) [Wars of the Three Kingdoms]
 Siege of Chester – 1644 – 1645 – First English Civil War, 1644 (First English Civil War) [Wars of the Three Kingdoms]
 First siege of Taunton – 1644 – First English Civil War, 1644 (First English Civil War) [Wars of the Three Kingdoms]
 Siege of Carlisle (1644) – 1644 – 1645 – First English Civil War, 1644 (First English Civil War) [Scotland in the Wars of the Three Kingdoms] [Wars of the Three Kingdoms]
 Second Battle of Newbury – 1644 – First English Civil War, 1644 (First English Civil War) [Wars of the Three Kingdoms]
 First siege of High Ercall Hall – 1645 – First English Civil War, 1645 (First English Civil War) [Wars of the Three Kingdoms]
 Battle of Weymouth – 1645 – First English Civil War, 1645 (First English Civil War) [Wars of the Three Kingdoms]
 Great Siege of Scarborough Castle – 1645 – First English Civil War, 1645 (First English Civil War) [Wars of the Three Kingdoms]
 Second siege of High Ercall Hall – 1645 – First English Civil War, 1645 (First English Civil War) [Wars of the Three Kingdoms]
 Second siege of Taunton – 1645 – First English Civil War, 1645 (First English Civil War) [Wars of the Three Kingdoms]
 Third siege of Taunton – 1645 – First English Civil War, 1645 (First English Civil War) [Wars of the Three Kingdoms]
 Second siege of Oxford – 1645 – First English Civil War, 1645 (First English Civil War) [Wars of the Three Kingdoms]
 Battle of Leicester – 1645 – First English Civil War, 1645 (First English Civil War) [Wars of the Three Kingdoms]
 Battle of Naseby – 1645 – First English Civil War, 1645 (First English Civil War) [Wars of the Three Kingdoms]
 Third siege of High Ercall Hall – 1645 – First English Civil War, 1645 (First English Civil War) [Wars of the Three Kingdoms]
 Second siege of Lathom House – 1645 – First English Civil War, 1645 (First English Civil War) [Wars of the Three Kingdoms]
 Battle of Langport – 1645 – First English Civil War, 1645 (First English Civil War) [Wars of the Three Kingdoms]
 Siege of Hereford – 1645 – First English Civil War, 1645 (First English Civil War) [Wars of the Three Kingdoms]
 Siege of Bristol (1645) – 1645 – First English Civil War, 1645 (First English Civil War) [Wars of the Three Kingdoms]
 Second siege of Chester – 1645 – 1646 – First English Civil War, 1645 (First English Civil War) [Wars of the Three Kingdoms]
 Battle of Rowton Heath – 1645 – First English Civil War, 1645 (First English Civil War) [Wars of the Three Kingdoms]
 Battle of Sherburn in Elmet – 1645 – First English Civil War, 1645 (First English Civil War) [Wars of the Three Kingdoms]
 Third siege of Basing House – 1645 – First English Civil War, 1645 (First English Civil War) [Wars of the Three Kingdoms]
 Storming of Shelford House – 1645 – First English Civil War, 1645 (First English Civil War) [Wars of the Three Kingdoms]
 Siege of Newark – 1645 – 1646 – First English Civil War, 1645 (First English Civil War) [Wars of the Three Kingdoms]
 Battle of Bovey Heath – 1646 – First English Civil War, 1646 (First English Civil War) [Wars of the Three Kingdoms]
 Battle of Torrington – 1646 – First English Civil War, 1646 (First English Civil War) [Wars of the Three Kingdoms]
 Battle of Stow-on-the-Wold – 1646 – First English Civil War, 1646 (First English Civil War) [Wars of the Three Kingdoms]
 Third siege of Oxford – 1646 – First English Civil War, 1646 (First English Civil War) [Wars of the Three Kingdoms]
 Siege of Worcester – 1646 – First English Civil War, 1646 (First English Civil War) [Wars of the Three Kingdoms]
 Battle of Maidstone – 1648 – Second English Civil War (Wars of the Three Kingdoms)
 Battle of St Neots (1648) – 1648 – Second English Civil War (Wars of the Three Kingdoms)
 Siege of Colchester – 1648 – Second English Civil War (Wars of the Three Kingdoms)
 Battle of Preston (1648) – 1648 – Second English Civil War (Scotland in the Wars of the Three Kingdoms) [Wars of the Three Kingdoms]
 Battle of Warrington Bridge (1651) – 1651 – Anglo-Scottish war (1650–1652) (Scotland in the Wars of the Three Kingdoms) [Wars of the Three Kingdoms]
 Battle of Wigan Lane – 1651 – Anglo-Scottish war (1650–1652) (Scotland in the Wars of the Three Kingdoms) [Wars of the Three Kingdoms]
 Battle of Upton – 1651 – Anglo-Scottish war (1650–1652) (Scotland in the Wars of the Three Kingdoms) [Wars of the Three Kingdoms]
 Battle of Worcester – 1651 – Anglo-Scottish war (1650–1652) (Scotland in the Wars of the Three Kingdoms) [Wars of the Three Kingdoms]
 Battle of Dover (1652) – 1652 – First Anglo-Dutch War (Anglo-Dutch Wars)
 Battle of Plymouth – 1652 – First Anglo-Dutch War (Anglo-Dutch Wars)
 Battle of the Kentish Knock – 1652 – First Anglo-Dutch War (Anglo-Dutch Wars)
 Battle of Dungeness – 1652 – First Anglo-Dutch War (Anglo-Dutch Wars)
 Battle of Portland – 1653 – First Anglo-Dutch War (Anglo-Dutch Wars)
 Battle of the Gabbard – 1653 – First Anglo-Dutch War (Anglo-Dutch Wars)
 Battle of Lowestoft – 1665 – Second Anglo-Dutch War (Anglo-Dutch Wars)
 Four Days' Battle – 1666 – Second Anglo-Dutch War (Anglo-Dutch Wars)
 St. James's Day Battle – 1666 – Second Anglo-Dutch War (Anglo-Dutch Wars)
 Battle of Dungeness (1666) – 1666 – Second Anglo-Dutch War (Anglo-Dutch Wars)
 Raid on the Medway – 1667 – Second Anglo-Dutch War (Anglo-Dutch Wars)
 Battle of Landguard Fort – 1667 – Second Anglo-Dutch War (Anglo-Dutch Wars)
 Battle of Solebay – 1672 – Third Anglo-Dutch War (Franco-Dutch War and Anglo-Dutch Wars)
 Battle of Sedgemoor – 1685 – Monmouth Rebellion
 Battle of Reading – 1688 – Glorious Revolution
 Battle of Beachy Head (1690) – 1690 – Nine Years' War
 Action of 2 May 1707 – 1707 – War of the Spanish Succession
 Battle at The Lizard – 1707 – War of the Spanish Succession
 Battle of Preston (1715) – 1715 – Jacobite rising of 1715 (Jacobite risings)
 Siege of Carlisle (November 1745) – 1745 – Jacobite rising of 1745 (Jacobite risings)
 Clifton Moor Skirmish – 1745 – Jacobite rising of 1745 (Jacobite risings)
 Siege of Carlisle (December 1745) – 1745 – Jacobite rising of 1745 (Jacobite risings)
 Action of 17 June 1778 – 1778 – American Revolutionary War
 Action of 17 August 1779 – 1779 – American Revolutionary War
 Battle of Flamborough Head – 1779 – American Revolutionary War
 Action of 2 March 1808 – 1808 – Gunboat War
 Battle of Britain – 1940 – World War II

Eritrea 

 Battle of Bab al-Mandab – 1551 – Ottoman–Portuguese conflicts (1538–1559) (Ottoman–Portuguese confrontations)

Estonia
 Battle of Iron Gate – 1032
 Battle of Ösel – 1206 – Livonian Crusade (Northern Crusades) [Crusades]
 Battle of Viljandi – 1211 – Livonian Crusade (Northern Crusades) [Crusades]
 Battle of Lehola – 1215 – Livonian Crusade (Northern Crusades) [Crusades]
 Battle of Otepää (1217) – 1217 – Livonian Crusade (Northern Crusades) [Crusades]
 Battle of St. Matthew's Day – 1217 – Livonian Crusade (Northern Crusades) [Crusades]
 Battle of Lyndanisse – 1219 – Livonian Crusade (Northern Crusades) [Crusades]
 Battle of Lihula – 1220 – Livonian Crusade (Northern Crusades) [Crusades]
 Siege of Tallinn – 1221 – Livonian Crusade (Northern Crusades) [Crusades]
 Battle of Ösel – 1222 – Livonian Crusade (Northern Crusades) [Crusades]
 Battle of Ümera – 1223 – Livonian Crusade (Northern Crusades) [Crusades]
 Battle of Viljandi (1223) – 1223 – Livonian Crusade (Northern Crusades) [Crusades]
 Siege of Tartu (1224) – 1224 – Livonian Crusade (Northern Crusades) [Crusades]
 Battle of Muhu – 1227 – Livonian Crusade (Northern Crusades) [Crusades]
 Battle on the Ice – 1242 – Livonian campaign against Rus' and Northern Crusades (Crusades)
 Battle of Wesenberg (1268) or Battle of Rakvere or Battle of Rakovor – 1268 – Northern Crusades (Crusades)
 Battle of Karuse – 1270 – Livonian Crusade (Northern Crusades) [Crusades]
 Siege of Narva (1558) – 1558 – Livonian War (Polish-Russian Wars, Polish–Swedish wars and Russo-Swedish Wars)
 Battle of Lode – 1573 – Livonian War (Polish-Russian Wars, Polish–Swedish wars and Russo-Swedish Wars)
 Siege of Wesenberg (1574) – 1574 – Livonian War (Polish-Russian Wars, Polish–Swedish wars and Russo-Swedish Wars)
 Battle of Karksi (1600) – 1600 – Polish–Swedish War (1600–1611) (Polish–Swedish wars)
 Siege of Fellin – 1602 – Polish–Swedish War (1600–1611) (Polish–Swedish wars)
 Siege of Weissenstein – 1602 – Polish–Swedish War (1600–1611) (Polish–Swedish wars)
 Battle of Reval (1602) – 1602 – Polish–Swedish War (1600–1611) (Polish–Swedish wars)
 Battle of Rakvere (1603) – 1603 – Polish–Swedish War (1600–1611) (Polish–Swedish wars)
 Battle of Weissenstein – 1604 – Polish–Swedish War (1600–1611) (Polish–Swedish wars)
 Siege of Pärnu – 1609 – Polish–Swedish War (1600–1611) (Polish–Swedish wars)
 Siege of Dorpat (1656) – 1656 – Russo-Swedish War (1656–1658) (Second Northern War) [Northern Wars]
 Battle of Walk – 1657 – Russo-Swedish War (1656–1658) (Second Northern War) [Northern Wars]
 Battle of Varja – 1700 – Great Northern War (Northern Wars)
 Battle of Narva – 1700 – Great Northern War (Northern Wars)
 Battle of Rauge – 1701 – Great Northern War (Northern Wars)
 Battle of Erastfer – 1702 – Great Northern War (Northern Wars)
 Battle of Hummelshof – 1702 – Great Northern War (Northern Wars)
 Battle of Wesenberg (1704) – 1704 – Great Northern War (Northern Wars)
 Siege of Narva (1704) – 1704 – Great Northern War (Northern Wars)
 Battle of Ösel Island – 1719 – Great Northern War (Northern Wars)
 Battle of Reval – 1790 – Russo-Swedish War (1788–90)
 Mahtra War – 1858
 Battle of Rägavere – 1918 – Estonian War of Independence
 Battle of Krivasoo – 1919 – Estonian War of Independence
 Battle of Laagna – 1919 – Estonian War of Independence
 Battle of Paju – 1919 – Estonian War of Independence
 Battle of Juminda – 1941 – World War II
 Battle of Kautla – 1941 – World War II
 Battle of Loobu – 1941 – World War II
 Battle of Ratva – 1941 – World War II
 Kingisepp–Gdov Offensive – 1944 – World War II
 Battle for Narva Bridgehead – 1944 – World War II
 Battle of Tannenberg Line – 1944 – World War II
 Battle of Emajõgi – 1944 – World War II
 Tallinn Offensive – 1944 – World War II
 Battle of Porkuni – 1944 – World War II
 Battle of Avinurme – 1944 – World War II
 Battle of Tehumardi – 1944 – World War II
 Battle of Osula – 1946 – Partisan war
 Battle of Saika – 1951 – Partisan war
 Battle of Puutli – 1953 – Partisan war

Ethiopia
 Battle of Shimbra Kure – 1529 – Ethiopian–Adal War
 Battle of Antukyah – 1531 – Ethiopian–Adal War
 Battle of Amba Sel – 1531 – Ethiopian–Adal War
 Battle of Sahart – 1541 – Ethiopian–Adal War
 Battle of Baçente – 1542 – Ethiopian–Adal War (Ottoman–Portuguese conflicts (1538–1559)) [Ottoman–Portuguese confrontations]
 Battle of Jarte – 1542 – Ethiopian–Adal War (Ottoman–Portuguese conflicts (1538–1559)) [Ottoman–Portuguese confrontations]
 Battle of the Hill of the Jews – 1542 – Ethiopian–Adal War (Ottoman–Portuguese conflicts (1538–1559)) [Ottoman–Portuguese confrontations]
 Battle of Wofla – 1542 – Ethiopian–Adal War (Ottoman–Portuguese conflicts (1538–1559)) [Ottoman–Portuguese confrontations]
Battle of Wayna Daga – 1543 – Ethiopian–Adal War (Ottoman–Portuguese conflicts (1538–1559)) [Ottoman–Portuguese confrontations]
Battle of Adwa – 1895
 Battle of Keren – 1941

Finland

 Battle at Herdaler – 1007 – 1008
 Battle of Hogland (1713) – 1713 – Great Northern War (Northern Wars)
 Battle of Pälkäne – 1713 – Great Northern War (Northern Wars)
 Battle of Napue – 1714 – Great Northern War (Northern Wars)
 Battle of Gangut – 1714 – Great Northern War (Northern Wars)
 Battle of Grengam – 1720 – Great Northern War (Northern Wars)
 Battle of Villmanstrand – 1741 – Russo-Swedish War (1741–1743) (War of the Austrian Succession)
 Battle of Porrassalmi – 1789 – Russo-Swedish War (1788–1790)
 Battle of Uttismalm – 1789 – Russo-Swedish War (1788–1790)
 Battle of Kaipiais – 1789 – Russo-Swedish War (1788–1790)
 Battle of Parkumäki – 1789 – Russo-Swedish War (1788–1790)
 Battle of Svensksund (1789) – 1789 – Russo-Swedish War (1788–1790)
 Battle of Elgsö – 1789 – Russo-Swedish War (1788–1790)
 Battle of Valkeala – 1790 – Russo-Swedish War (1788–1790)
 Battle of Pardakoski–Kärnakoski – 1790 – Russo-Swedish War (1788–1790)
 Battle of Fredrikshamn – 1790 – Russo-Swedish War (1788–1790)
 Battle of Keltis – 1790 – Russo-Swedish War (1788–1790)
 Battle of Savitaipal – 1790 – Russo-Swedish War (1788–1790)
 Battle of Svensksund – 1790 – Russo-Swedish War (1788–1790)
 Battle of Pyhäjoki – 1808 – Finnish War (Napoleonic Wars)
 Battle of Siikajoki – 1808 – Finnish War (Napoleonic Wars)
 Battle of Revolax – 1808 – Finnish War (Napoleonic Wars)
 Siege of Sveaborg – 1808 – Finnish War (Napoleonic Wars)
 Battle of Pulkkila – 1808 – Finnish War (Napoleonic Wars)
 Battle of Kumlinge – 1808 – Finnish War (Napoleonic Wars)
 Battle of Kuopio – 1808 – Finnish War (Napoleonic Wars)
 Battle of Lemo – 1808 – Finnish War (Napoleonic Wars)
 Battle of Nykarleby – 1808 – Finnish War (Napoleonic Wars)
 Battle of Vaasa – 1808 – Finnish War (Napoleonic Wars)
 Battle of Rimito Kramp – 1808 – Finnish War (Napoleonic Wars)
 Battle of Lintulaks – 1808 – Finnish War (Napoleonic Wars)
 Battle of Kokonsaari – 1808 – Finnish War (Napoleonic Wars)
 Battle of Lapua – 1808 – Finnish War (Napoleonic Wars)
 Battle of Sandöström – 1808 – Finnish War (Napoleonic Wars)
 Battle of Kauhajoki – 1808 – Finnish War (Napoleonic Wars)
 Battle of Alavus – 1808 – Finnish War (Napoleonic Wars)
 Battle of Karstula – 1808 – Finnish War (Napoleonic Wars)
 Battle of Nummijärvi – 1808 – Finnish War (Napoleonic Wars)
 Battle of Lappfjärd – 1808 – Finnish War (Napoleonic Wars)
 Battle of Grönvikssund – 1808 – Finnish War (Napoleonic Wars)
 Battle of Ruona–Salmi – 1808 – Finnish War (Napoleonic Wars)
 Battle of Jutas – 1808 – Finnish War (Napoleonic Wars)
 Battle of Oravais – 1808 – Finnish War (Napoleonic Wars)
 Battle of Lokalaks – 1808 – Finnish War (Napoleonic Wars)
 Battle of Palva Sund – 1808 – Finnish War (Napoleonic Wars)
 Helsinki village landing – 1808 – Finnish War (Napoleonic Wars)
 Battle of Koljonvirta – 1808 – Finnish War (Napoleonic Wars)
  Battle of Tampere – 1918
 Battle of Länkipohja – 1918
  Battle of Petsamo – 1939
  Battle of Salla – 1939
  Battle of Kollaa – 1939
  Battle of Suomussalmi – 1939
  Battle of Tolvajärvi – 1939
  Battle of Taipale – 1939
  Battle of Raate-Road – 1940
  Battle of Summa – 1940
  Battle of Honkaniemi – 1940
  Battle of Tali-Ihantala – 1944
  Battle of the Bay of Viipuri – 1944
  Battle of Vuosalmi – 1944
  Battle of Nietjärvi – 1944
  Battle of Ilomantsi – 1944
  Battle of Tornio – 1944
  Battle of Rovaniemi – 1944
  Battle of Kuhmo

France
 Battle of Alalia – between 540 BC and 535 BC – Carthaginian Expansion
 Battle of Rhone Crossing – 218 BC – Second Punic War (Punic Wars)
 Battle of Burdigala – 107 BC – Cimbrian War (Roman–Germanic wars)
 Battle of Arausio – 105 BC – Cimbrian War (Roman–Germanic wars)
 Battle of Aquae Sextiae – 102 BC – Cimbrian War (Roman–Germanic wars)
 Battle of Magetobriga – 63 BC – Gallic Wars
 Battle of the Arar – 58 BC – Gallic Wars
 Battle of Bibracte – 58 BC – Gallic Wars
 Battle of Vosges – 58 BC – Gallic Wars (Roman–Germanic wars)
 Battle of the Axona – 57 BC – Gallic Wars
 Battle of the Sabis – 57 BC – Gallic Wars (Roman–Germanic wars)
 Siege of Avaricum – 52 BC – Gallic Wars
 Battle of Gergovia – 52 BC – Gallic Wars
 Battle of Lutetia – 52 BC – Gallic Wars
 Battle of Alesia – 52 BC – Gallic Wars
 Siege of Uxellodunum – 51 BC – Gallic Wars
 Siege of Massilia – 49 BC – Caesar's civil war
 Battle of Tauroento – 49 BC – Caesar's civil war
 Battle of Forum Julii – 69 – Year of the Four Emperors
 Battle of Lugdunum – 197 – Year of the Five Emperors
 Siege of Augustodunum Haeduorum – 269 – 270 – Crisis of the Third Century
 Battle of Châlons (274) – 274 – Crisis of the Third Century
 Battle of Lingones – 298 – Roman–Germanic wars
 Battle of Mons Seleucus – 353 – Roman civil war of 350–353
 Siege of Senonae – 356 – Roman–Germanic wars
 Siege of Autun – 356 – Roman–Germanic wars
 Battle of Durocortorum – 356 – Roman–Germanic wars
 Battle of Brumath – 356 – Roman–Germanic wars
 Battle of Strasbourg – 357 – Roman–Germanic wars
 Battle of Argentovaria – 378 – Roman–Germanic wars
 Siege of Massilia (413) – 413 – Fall of the Western Roman Empire
 Siege of Arles (425) – 425 – Fall of the Western Roman Empire
 Battle of Arles (435) – 435 – Fall of the Western Roman Empire
 Battle of Narbonne (436) – 436 – 437 – Fall of the Western Roman Empire and Roman–Germanic wars
 Battle of Toulouse (439) – 439 – Fall of the Western Roman Empire
 Battle of Vicus Helena – c. between 445 and 450 – Fall of the Western Roman Empire and Roman–Germanic wars
 Battle of the Catalaunian Plains – 451 – Fall of the Western Roman Empire and Roman–Germanic wars
 Battle of Corsica – 456 – Fall of the Western Roman Empire
 Battle of Toulouse (458) – 458 – Fall of the Western Roman Empire
 Battle of Arelate – 458 – Fall of the Western Roman Empire and Roman–Germanic wars
 Battle of Orleans (463) – 463 – Roman–Germanic wars and Fall of the Western Roman Empire
 Battle of Déols – c. 469 – Roman–Germanic wars and Fall of the Western Roman Empire
 Battle of Arles (471) – 471 – Fall of the Western Roman Empire
 Battle of Soissons (486) – 486 – Roman–Germanic wars and Fall of the Western Roman Empire
 Battle of Strasbourg (506) – 506 – Clovis I's campaigns
 Battle of Vouillé – 507 – Franco-Visigothic Wars
 Battle of Compiègne – 715 – Frankish Civil War
 Battle of Vincy – 717 – Frankish Civil War
 Battle of Soissons (718) – 718 – Frankish Civil War
 Battle of Toulouse – 721 – Umayyad invasion of Gaul
 Battle of the River Garonne – 732 – Umayyad invasion of Gaul
 Battle of Tours – 732 – Umayyad invasion of Gaul
 Siege of Avignon (737) – 737 – Umayyad invasion of Gaul
 Siege of Narbonne (737) – 737 – Umayyad invasion of Gaul
 Battle of the River Berre – 737 – Umayyad invasion of Gaul
 Siege of Nîmes – 737 – Umayyad invasion of Gaul
 Siege of Narbonne (752–759) – 752 – 759 – Umayyad invasion of Gaul
 Battle of Blain – 843 – Franco-Breton wars
 Siege of Paris (845) – 845 – Viking expansion
 Battle of Ballon – 845 – Franco-Breton wars
 Battle of Jengland – 851 – Franco-Breton wars
 Battle of Brissarthe – 866 – Viking expansion and Franco-Breton wars
 Battle of Saucourt-en-Vimeu – 881 – Viking expansion
 Siege of Paris (885–886) – 885 – 886 – Viking expansion
 Siege of Chartres (911) – 911 – Viking expansion
 Battle of Trans-la-Forêt – 939 – Franco-Breton wars and Viking expansion
 Battle of Fraxinet – 942 – Hungarian invasions of Europe
 Battle of Conquereuil – 992 – Franco-Breton wars
 Battle of Pontlevoy – 1016
 Battle of Dinan – 1065 – Breton–Norman war
 Battle of Pouancé – 1066 – Breton–Norman war
 Battle of Segré – 1066 – Breton–Norman war
 Battle of Brémule – 1119 – Anglo-French Wars
 Battle of Mirebeau – 1202 – French invasion of Normandy (1202–1204) (Anglo-French Wars)
 Siege of Château Gaillard – 1203 – 1204 – French invasion of Normandy (1202–1204) (Anglo-French Wars)
 Siege of Minerve – 1210 – Albigensian Crusade (Crusades)
 Battle of Muret – 1213 – Albigensian Crusade (Crusades)
 Siege of Roche-au-Moine – 1214 – Anglo-French War (1213–1214) (Anglo-French Wars)
 Battle of Bouvines – 1214 – Anglo-French War (1213–1214) (Anglo-French Wars)
 Siege of Toulouse (1217–1218) – 1217 – 1218 – Albigensian Crusade (Crusades)
 Siege of Avignon (1226) – 1226 – Albigensian Crusade (Crusades)
 Battle of Taillebourg – 1242 – Saintonge War
 Siege of Saintes – 1242 – Saintonge War
 Siege of Montségur – 1243 – 1244 – Albigensian Crusade (Crusades)
 Battle of the Col de Panissars – 1285 – Aragonese Crusade (Crusades and War of the Sicilian Vespers)
 Battle of Arques (1303) – 1303 – Franco-Flemish War
 Battle of Mons-en-Pévèle or Battle of Pevelenberg – 1304 – Franco-Flemish War
 Battle of Cassel (1328) – 1328 – 1323–1328 Flemish revolt
 Siege of Cambrai (1339) – 1339 – Thiérache campaign (Edwardian Phase) [Hundred Years' War]
 Battle of Saint-Omer – 1340 – Tournaisis campaign of 1340 (Edwardian Phase) [Hundred Years' War]
 Battle of Champtoceaux – 1341 – War of the Breton Succession (Hundred Years' War)
 Sieges of Vannes (1342) – 1342 – War of the Breton Succession (Hundred Years' War)
 Siege of Hennebont (1342) – 1342 – War of the Breton Succession (Hundred Years' War)
 Battle of Brest (1342) or Battle of the River Penfeld – 1342 – War of the Breton Succession (Hundred Years' War)
 Battle of Morlaix – 1342 – War of the Breton Succession (Hundred Years' War)
 Battle of Cadoret – 1345 – War of the Breton Succession (Hundred Years' War)
 Battle of Bergerac – 1345 – Gascon campaign of 1345 (Hundred Years' War, 1345–1347) [Edwardian Phase] [Hundred Years' War]
 Battle of Auberoche – 1345 – Gascon campaign of 1345 (Hundred Years' War, 1345–1347) [Edwardian Phase] [Hundred Years' War]
 Siege of Aiguillon – 1346 – Hundred Years' War, 1345–1347 (Edwardian Phase) [Hundred Years' War]
 Battle of St Pol de Léon – 1346 – War of the Breton Succession (Hundred Years' War)
 Battle of Caen (1346) – 1346 – Crécy campaign (Hundred Years' War, 1345–1347) [Edwardian Phase] [Hundred Years' War]
 Battle of Blanchetaque – 1346 – Crécy campaign (Hundred Years' War, 1345–1347) [Edwardian Phase] [Hundred Years' War]
 Battle of Crécy – 1346 – Crécy campaign (Hundred Years' War, 1345–1347) [Edwardian Phase] [Hundred Years' War]
 Siege of Calais (1346–1347) – 1346 – 1347 – Crécy campaign (Hundred Years' War, 1345–1347) [Edwardian Phase] [Hundred Years' War]
 Battle of La Roche-Derrien – 1347 – War of the Breton Succession (Hundred Years' War)
 Battle of Lunalonge – 1349 – Edwardian Phase (Hundred Years' War)
 Battle of Calais – 1350 – Edwardian Phase (Hundred Years' War)
 Siege of Saint-Jean-d'Angély (1351) – 1351 – Edwardian Phase (Hundred Years' War)
 Combat of the Thirty – 1351 – War of the Breton Succession (Hundred Years' War)
 Battle of Saintes – 1351 – Edwardian Phase (Hundred Years' War)
 Battle of Ardres – 1351 – Edwardian Phase (Hundred Years' War)
 Siege of Guînes (1352) – 1352 – Edwardian Phase (Hundred Years' War)
 Battle of Mauron – 1352 – War of the Breton Succession (Hundred Years' War)
 Battle of Montmuran – 1354 – War of the Breton Succession (Hundred Years' War)
 Siege of Breteuil – 1356 – Edwardian Phase (Hundred Years' War)
 Battle of Poitiers – 1356 – Edwardian Phase (Hundred Years' War)
 Siege of Rennes (1356–1357) – 1356 – 1357 – War of the Breton Succession (Hundred Years' War)
 Black Monday (1360) or Siege of Chartres (1360) – 1360 – Edwardian Phase (Hundred Years' War)
 Battle of Cocherel – 1364 – Caroline War (Hundred Years' War)
 Battle of Auray – 1364 – War of the Breton Succession (Hundred Years' War)
 Siege of Limoges – 1370 – Caroline War (Hundred Years' War)
 Battle of Pontvallain – 1370 – Caroline War (Hundred Years' War)
 Battle of La Rochelle – 1372 – Caroline War (Hundred Years' War)
 Battle of Chiset or Battle of Chizai or Battle of Chizé – 1373 – Caroline War (Hundred Years' War)
 Siege of Brest (1386) – 1386 – Caroline War (Hundred Years' War)
 Siege of Harfleur – 1415 – Lancastrian War (Hundred Years' War) 
 Battle of Agincourt – 1415 – Lancastrian War (Hundred Years' War)
 Battle of Valmont – 1416 – Lancastrian War (Hundred Years' War)
 Siege of Caen (1417) – 1417 – Lancastrian War (Hundred Years' War)
 Siege of Rouen (1418–1419) – 1418 – 1419 – Lancastrian War (Hundred Years' War)
 Battle of La Rochelle (1419) – 1419 – Lancastrian War (Hundred Years' War)
 Battle of Baugé – 1421 – Lancastrian War (Hundred Years' War) and Anglo-Scottish Wars
 Siege of Meaux – 1421 – 1422 – Lancastrian War (Hundred Years' War)
 Battle of Cravant – 1423 – Lancastrian War (Hundred Years' War) and Anglo-Scottish Wars
 Battle of La Brossinière or Battle of la Gravelle – 1423 – Lancastrian War (Hundred Years' War)
 Battle of Verneuil – 1424 – Lancastrian War (Hundred Years' War) and Anglo-Scottish Wars
 Battle of St. James – 1426 – Lancastrian War (Hundred Years' War)
 Siege of Montargis – 1427 – Lancastrian War (Hundred Years' War)
 Siege of Orléans – 1428 – 1429 – Loire Campaign (1429) (Lancastrian War) [Hundred Years' War]
 Battle of the Herrings or Battle of Rouvray – 1429 – Loire Campaign (1429) (Lancastrian War) [Hundred Years' War] and Anglo-Scottish Wars
 Battle of Jargeau – 1429 – Loire Campaign (1429) (Lancastrian War) [Hundred Years' War]
 Battle of Meung-sur-Loire – 1429 – Loire Campaign (1429) (Lancastrian War) [Hundred Years' War]
 Battle of Beaugency (1429) – 1429 – Loire Campaign (1429) (Lancastrian War) [Hundred Years' War]
 Battle of Patay – 1429 – Loire Campaign (1429) (Lancastrian War) [Hundred Years' War]
 Siege of Paris (1429) – 1429 – Lancastrian War (Hundred Years' War)
 Siege of Saint-Pierre-le-Moûtier – 1429 – Lancastrian War (Hundred Years' War)
 Siege of La Charité – 1429 – Lancastrian War (Hundred Years' War)
 Siege of Compiègne – 1430 – Lancastrian War (Hundred Years' War)
 Battle of Gerberoy – 1435 – Lancastrian War (Hundred Years' War)
 Siege of Saint-Denis (1435) – 1435 – Lancastrian War (Hundred Years' War)
 Siege of Calais (1436) – 1436 – Lancastrian War (Hundred Years' War)
 Siege of Tartas – 1440 – 1442 – Lancastrian War (Hundred Years' War)
 Siege of Creil – 1441 – Lancastrian War (Hundred Years' War)
 Siege of Pontoise – 1441 – Lancastrian War (Hundred Years' War)
 Siege of Dieppe – 1442 – 1443 – Lancastrian War (Hundred Years' War)
 Battle of Formigny – 1450 – Lancastrian War (Hundred Years' War)
 Siege of Caen (1450) – 1450 – Lancastrian War (Hundred Years' War)
 Siege of Falaise (1450) – 1450 – Lancastrian War (Hundred Years' War)
 Siege of Cherbourg (1450) – 1450 – Lancastrian War (Hundred Years' War)
 Battle of Blanquefort – 1450 – Lancastrian War (Hundred Years' War)
 Battle of Castillon – 1453 – Lancastrian War (Hundred Years' War)
 Battle of Héricourt – 1474 – Burgundian Wars
 Battle of Nancy – 1477 – Burgundian Wars
 Battle of Guinegate (1479) – 1479 – War of the Burgundian Succession
 Battle of Saint-Mathieu – 1512 – War of the League of Cambrai (Italian Wars)
 Battle of the Spurs or Battle of Guinegate (1513) – 1513 – War of the League of Cambrai (Italian Wars)
 Siege of Dijon – 1513 – War of the League of Cambrai (Italian Wars)
 Siege of Mézières – 1521 – Italian War of 1521–1526 (Italian Wars)
 Siege of Marseille (1524) – 1524 – Italian War of 1521–1526 (Italian Wars)
 Siege of Perpignan (1542) – 1542 – Italian War of 1542–1546 (Italian Wars)
 Siege of Nice – 1543 – Italian War of 1542–1546 (Italian Wars)
 Siege of Landrecies (1543) – 1543 – Italian War of 1542–1546 (Italian Wars)
 Siege of Saint-Dizier – 1544 – Italian War of 1542–1546 (Italian Wars)
 First siege of Boulogne – 1544 – Italian War of 1542–1546 (Italian Wars)
 Second Siege of Boulogne – 1544 – Italian War of 1542–1546 (Italian Wars)
 Siege of Metz (1552) – 1552 – 1553 – Italian War of 1551–1559 (Italian Wars)
 Battle of Renty – 1554 – Italian War of 1551–1559 (Italian Wars)
 Battle of St. Quentin (1557) – 1557 – Italian War of 1551–1559 (Italian Wars)
 Siege of Calais (1558) – 1558 – Anglo-French War (1557–1559) (Italian War of 1551–1559) [Italian Wars]
 Siege of Thionville (1558) – 1558 – Italian War of 1551–1559 (Italian Wars)
 Battle of Gravelines (1558) – 1558 – Italian War of 1551–1559 (Italian Wars)
 Siege of Rouen (1562) – 1562 – French Wars of Religion (European wars of religion)
 Battle of Vergt – 1562 – French Wars of Religion (European wars of religion)
 Battle of Dreux – 1562 – French Wars of Religion (European wars of religion)
 Siege of Orléans (1563) – 1563 – French Wars of Religion (European wars of religion)
 Siege of Valenciennes (1567) – 1566 – 1567 – Eighty Years' War, 1566–1572 (Eighty Years' War) [European wars of religion]
 Battle of Wattrelos – 1566 – Eighty Years' War, 1566–1572 (Eighty Years' War) [European wars of religion]
 Battle of Lannoy – 1566 – Eighty Years' War, 1566–1572 (Eighty Years' War) [European wars of religion]
 Battle of Saint-Denis – 1567 – French Wars of Religion (European wars of religion)
 Siege of Chartres (1568) – 1568 – French Wars of Religion (European wars of religion)
 Battle of Le Quesnoy (1568) – 1568 – Eighty Years' War, 1566–1572 (Eighty Years' War) [European wars of religion]
 Battle of Jarnac – 1569 – French Wars of Religion (European wars of religion)
 Battle of La Roche-l'Abeille – 1569 – French Wars of Religion (European wars of religion)
 Siege of Poitiers (1569) – 1569 – French Wars of Religion (European wars of religion)
 Battle of Orthez (1569) – 1569 – French Wars of Religion (European wars of religion)
 Battle of Moncontour – 1569 – French Wars of Religion (European wars of religion)
 Siege of La Rochelle (1572–1573) – 1572 – 1573 – French Wars of Religion (European wars of religion)
 Siege of Sancerre – 1572 – 1573 – French Wars of Religion (European wars of religion)
 Siege of Sommières – 1573 – French Wars of Religion (European wars of religion)
 Battle of Dormans – 1575 – French Wars of Religion (European wars of religion)
 Battle of Coutras – 1587 – War of the Three Henrys (French Wars of Religion) [European wars of religion]
 Battle of Vimory – 1587 – War of the Three Henrys (French Wars of Religion) [European wars of religion]
 Battle of Arques – 1589 – Succession of Henry IV of France (French Wars of Religion) [European wars of religion] and Anglo-Spanish War (1585–1604) (Eighty Years' War)
 Battle of Ivry – 1590 – Succession of Henry IV of France (French Wars of Religion) [European wars of religion] and Anglo-Spanish War (1585–1604) (Eighty Years' War)
 Siege of Paris (1590) – 1590 – Succession of Henry IV of France (French Wars of Religion) [European wars of religion] and Anglo-Spanish War (1585–1604) (Eighty Years' War)
 Battle of Château-Laudran – 1591 – Succession of Henry IV of France (French Wars of Religion) [European wars of religion] and Anglo-Spanish War (1585–1604) (Eighty Years' War)
 Siege of Rouen (1591–1592) – 1591 – 1592 – Succession of Henry IV of France (French Wars of Religion) [European wars of religion] and Anglo-Spanish War (1585–1604) (Eighty Years' War)
 Siege of Caudebec – 1592 – Succession of Henry IV of France (French Wars of Religion) [European wars of religion] and Anglo-Spanish War (1585–1604) (Eighty Years' War)
 Battle of Craon – 1592 – Succession of Henry IV of France (French Wars of Religion) [European wars of religion] and Anglo-Spanish War (1585–1604) (Eighty Years' War)
 Battle of Blaye – 1593 – Succession of Henry IV of France (French Wars of Religion) [European wars of religion] and Anglo-Spanish War (1585–1604) (Eighty Years' War)
 Siege of Morlaix (1594) – 1594 – Succession of Henry IV of France (French Wars of Religion) [European wars of religion] and Anglo-Spanish War (1585–1604) (Eighty Years' War)
 Siege of Fort Crozon – 1594 – Succession of Henry IV of France (French Wars of Religion) [European wars of religion] and Anglo-Spanish War (1585–1604) (Eighty Years' War)
 Battle of Fontaine-Française – 1595 – Franco-Spanish War (1595-1598) (French Wars of Religion) [European wars of religion]
 Siege of Le Catelet (1595) – 1595 – Franco-Spanish War (1595-1598) (French Wars of Religion) [European wars of religion]
 Siege of Doullens – 1595 – Franco-Spanish War (1595-1598) (French Wars of Religion) [European wars of religion]
 Battle of Guadalupe Island (1595) – 1595 – Anglo-Spanish War (1585–1604)
 Siege of Calais (1596) – 1596 – Franco-Spanish War (1595-1598) (French Wars of Religion) [European wars of religion] and Anglo-Spanish War (1585–1604) (Eighty Years' War)
 Siege of Amiens (1597) – 1597 – Franco-Spanish War (1595-1598) (French Wars of Religion) [European wars of religion] and Anglo-Spanish War (1585–1604) (Eighty Years' War)
 Battle of the Narrow Seas – 1602 – Anglo-Spanish War (1585–1604) and Eighty Years' War, 1599–1609 (Eighty Years' War) [European wars of religion]
 Capture of Saint Martin (1633) – 1633 – Eighty Years' War, 1621–1648 (Eighty Years' War and Thirty Years' War) [European wars of religion]
 Crossing of the Somme – 1636 – Franco-Spanish War (1635–1659) (Thirty Years' War)
 Siege of Saint-Omer – 1638 – Franco-Spanish War (1635–1659) (Thirty Years' War)
 Action of 18 February 1639 – 1639 – Eighty Years' War, 1621–1648 (Eighty Years' War and Thirty Years' War) [European wars of religion]
 Relief of Thionville – 1639 – Franco-Spanish War (1635–1659) (Thirty Years' War)
 Siege of Salses – 1639 – 1640 – Franco-Spanish War (1635–1659) (Thirty Years' War)
 Action of 18 September 1639 – 1639 – Eighty Years' War, 1621–1648 (Eighty Years' War and Thirty Years' War) [European wars of religion]
 Siege of Arras (1640) – 1640 – Franco-Spanish War (1635–1659) (Thirty Years' War)
 Battle of La Marfée – 1641 – Franco-Spanish War (1635–1659) (Thirty Years' War)
 Siege of Perpignan (1642)) – 1641 – 1642 – Reapers' War and (Franco-Spanish War (1635–1659)) [Thirty Years' War]
 Battle of Honnecourt – 1642 – Franco-Spanish War (1635–1659) (Thirty Years' War)
 Battle of Rocroi – 1643 – Franco-Spanish War (1635–1659) (Thirty Years' War)
 Attack on Saint Martin – 1644 – Eighty Years' War, 1621–1648 (Eighty Years' War and Thirty Years' War) [European wars of religion]
 Siege of Gravelines (1644) – 1644 – Franco-Spanish War (1635–1659) (Thirty Years' War)
 Battle of Lens – 1648 – Franco-Spanish War (1635–1659) (Thirty Years' War)
 Battle of Dover (1652) – 1652 – First Anglo-Dutch War (Anglo-Dutch Wars)
 Battle of Bordeaux – 1653 – Franco-Spanish War (1635–1659) (Thirty Years' War)
 Battle of Arras – 1654 – Franco-Spanish War (1635–1659) (Thirty Years' War)
 Battle of Valenciennes – 1656 – Franco-Spanish War (1635–1659) (Thirty Years' War)
 Siege of Dunkirk (1658) – 1658 – Anglo-Spanish War (1654–1660)  (Franco-Spanish War (1635–1659)) [Thirty Years' War]
 Battle of the Dunes – 1658 – Anglo-Spanish War (1654–1660) (Franco-Spanish War (1635–1659)) [Thirty Years' War]
 Battle of Martinique (1667) – 1667 – Second Anglo-Dutch War (Anglo-Dutch Wars)
 Siege of Lille (1667) – 1667 – War of Devolution (Franco-Spanish War)
 Capture of Cayenne (1667) – 1667 – Second Anglo-Dutch War (Anglo-Dutch Wars)
 Siege of Besançon – 1674 – Franco-Dutch War
 Invasion of Martinique (1674) – 1674 – Franco-Dutch War
 Battle of Entzheim – 1674 – Franco-Dutch War
 Battle of Mulhouse (1674) – 1674 – Franco-Dutch War
 Battle of Turckheim – 1675 – Franco-Dutch War
 Siege of Valenciennes (1676–1677) – 1677 – Franco-Dutch War
 Siege of Cambrai (1677) – 1677 – Franco-Dutch War
 Battle of Cassel (1677) – 1677 – Franco-Dutch War
 Action at Barfleur – 1692 – Battles of Barfleur and La Hougue (Nine Years' War)
 Action at Cherbourg (1692) – 1692 – Battles of Barfleur and La Hougue (Nine Years' War)
 Action at La Hogue (1692) – 1692 – Battles of Barfleur and La Hougue (Nine Years' War)
 Battle of Camaret – 1694 – Nine Years' War
 Siege of Guadeloupe – 1703 – War of the Spanish Succession
 Siege of Nice (1705) – 1705 – 1706 – War of the Spanish Succession
 Siege of Haguenau (1705) – 1705 – War of the Spanish Succession
 Siege of Toulon (1707) – 1707 – War of the Spanish Succession
 Siege of Lille (1708) – 1708 – War of the Spanish Succession
 Battle of Malplaquet – 1709 – War of the Spanish Succession
 Siege of Bouchain (1711) – 1711 – War of the Spanish Succession
 Battle of Denain – 1712 – War of the Spanish Succession
 Siege of Bouchain (1712) – 1712 – War of the Spanish Succession
 Action of 14 June 1742 – 1742 – War of Jenkins' Ear (War of the Austrian Succession)
 Battle of Toulon (1744) – 1744 – War of Jenkins' Ear (War of the Austrian Succession)
 Siege of Villafranca (1744) – 1744 – War of Jenkins' Ear (War of the Austrian Succession)
 Raid on Rochefort – 1757 – Seven Years' War
 Action of 29 April 1758 – 1758 – Seven Years' War
 Raid on St Malo – 1758 – Seven Years' War
 Raid on Cherbourg – 1758 – Seven Years' War
 Battle of Saint Cast – 1758 – Seven Years' War
 Invasion of Martinique (1759) – 1759 – Seven Years' War
 Invasion of Guadeloupe (1759) – 1759 – Seven Years' War
 Raid on Le Havre – 1759 – Planned French invasion of Britain (1759) (Seven Years' War)
 Battle of Quiberon Bay – 1759 – Planned French invasion of Britain (1759) (Seven Years' War)
 Invasion of Martinique (1762) – 1762 – Seven Years' War
 Battle of Borgo – 1768 – French conquest of Corsica
 Battle of Ponte Novu – 1769 – French conquest of Corsica
 Battle of Ushant (1778) – 1778 – American Revolutionary War
 Action of 6 October 1779 – 1779 – American Revolutionary War
 Battle of Martinique (1779) – 1779 – American Revolutionary War
 Battle of Guadeloupe (1779) – 1779 – American Revolutionary War
 Battle of Martinique (1780) – 1780 – American Revolutionary War
 Action of 10 August 1780 – 1780 – American Revolutionary War
 Action of 4 January 1781 – 1781 – American Revolutionary War
 Battle of Fort Royal – 1781 – Anglo-French War (1778–1783) (American Revolutionary War)
 Battle of Ushant (1781) – 1781 – American Revolutionary War
 Battle of Ushant (1782) – 1782 – American Revolutionary War
 Action of 4 September 1782 – 1782 – American Revolutionary War
 Action of 6 December 1782 – 1782 – American Revolutionary War
 Action of 15 February 1783 – 1783 – American Revolutionary War
 Insurrection of 10 August 1792 – 1792 – War of the First Coalition (French Revolutionary Wars)
 Capture of Longwy – 1792 – War of the First Coalition (French Revolutionary Wars)
 Siege of Thionville (1792) – 1792 – War of the First Coalition (French Revolutionary Wars)
 Battle of Verdun (1792) – 1792 – War of the First Coalition (French Revolutionary Wars)
 Battle of Valmy – 1792 – War of the First Coalition (French Revolutionary Wars)
 Siege of Lille (1792) – 1792 – War of the First Coalition (French Revolutionary Wars)
 Capture of Nice – 1792 – War of the First Coalition (French Revolutionary Wars)
 Recapture of Longwy – 1792 – War of the First Coalition (French Revolutionary Wars)
 First Massacre of Machecoul – 1793 – War in the Vendée (French Revolutionary Wars)
 First Battle of Cholet – 1793 – War in the Vendée (French Revolutionary Wars)
 Siege of Condé (1793) – 1793 – War of the First Coalition (French Revolutionary Wars)
 Battle of Thouars – 1793 – War in the Vendée (French Revolutionary Wars)
 Battle of Raismes (1793) – 1793 – War of the First Coalition (French Revolutionary Wars)
 Battle of Mas Deu – 1793 – War of the First Coalition (French Revolutionary Wars)
 Battle of Fontenay-le-Comte – 1793 – War in the Vendée (French Revolutionary Wars)
 Battle of Famars – 1793 – War of the First Coalition (French Revolutionary Wars)
 Siege of Bellegarde (1793) – 1793 – War of the First Coalition (French Revolutionary Wars)
 Siege of Valenciennes (1793) – 1793 – War of the First Coalition (French Revolutionary Wars)
 First Battle of Saorgio (1793) – 1793 – War of the First Coalition (French Revolutionary Wars)
 Battle of Saumur (1793) – 1793 – War in the Vendée (French Revolutionary Wars)
 Battle of Nantes – 1793 – War in the Vendée (French Revolutionary Wars)
 First Battle of Châtillon – 1793 – War in the Vendée (French Revolutionary Wars)
 Battle of Perpignan – 1793 – War of the First Coalition (French Revolutionary Wars)
 Battle of Vihiers – 1793 – War in the Vendée (French Revolutionary Wars)
 Battle of Caesar's Camp – 1793 – War of the First Coalition (French Revolutionary Wars)
 Siege of Lyon – 1793 – War of the First Coalition (French Revolutionary Wars)
 Battle of Luçon – 1793 – War in the Vendée (French Revolutionary Wars)
 Battle of Lincelles – 1793 – War of the First Coalition (French Revolutionary Wars)
 Siege of Dunkirk (1793) – 1793 – War of the First Coalition (French Revolutionary Wars)
 Siege of Le Quesnoy (1793) – 1793 – War of the First Coalition (French Revolutionary Wars)
 Siege of Toulon (1793) – 1793 – War of the First Coalition (French Revolutionary Wars)
 Battle of Chantonnay – 1793 – War in the Vendée (French Revolutionary Wars)
 Battle of Hondschoote – 1793 – War of the First Coalition (French Revolutionary Wars)
 Battle of Avesnes-le-Sec – 1793 – War of the First Coalition (French Revolutionary Wars)
 Battle of Méribel – 1793 – War of the First Coalition (French Revolutionary Wars)
 Battle of Epierre – 1793 – War of the First Coalition (French Revolutionary Wars)
 Battle of Peyrestortes – 1793 – War of the First Coalition (French Revolutionary Wars)
 Battle of Coron (1793) – 1793 – War in the Vendée (French Revolutionary Wars)
 Battle of Tiffauges – 1793 – War in the Vendée (French Revolutionary Wars)
 Battle of Pont-Barré – 1793 – War in the Vendée (French Revolutionary Wars)
 Battle of Montaigu – 1793 – War in the Vendée (French Revolutionary Wars)
 Battle of Saint-Fulgent – 1793 – War in the Vendée (French Revolutionary Wars)
 Siege of Maubeuge (1793) – 1793 – War of the First Coalition (French Revolutionary Wars)
 Second Battle of Châtillon – 1793 – War in the Vendée (French Revolutionary Wars)
 First Battle of Noirmoutier – 1793 – War in the Vendée (French Revolutionary Wars)
 First Battle of Wissembourg (1793) – 1793 – War of the First Coalition (French Revolutionary Wars)
 Siege of Fort-Louis (1793) – 1793 – War of the First Coalition (French Revolutionary Wars)
 Battle of Wattignies – 1793 – War of the First Coalition (French Revolutionary Wars)
 Battle of La Tremblaye – 1793 – War in the Vendée (French Revolutionary Wars)
 Second Battle of Cholet – 1793 – War in the Vendée (French Revolutionary Wars)
 Battle of Laval – 1793 – Virée de Galerne (War in the Vendée) [French Revolutionary Wars]
 Battle of Entrames – 1793 – Virée de Galerne (War in the Vendée) [French Revolutionary Wars]
 Battle of Fougères – 1793 – Virée de Galerne (War in the Vendée) [French Revolutionary Wars]
 Battle of Granville – 1793 – Virée de Galerne (War in the Vendée) [French Revolutionary Wars]
 Battle of Haguenau (1793) – 1793 – War of the First Coalition (French Revolutionary Wars)
 Battle of Dol – 1793 – Virée de Galerne (War in the Vendée) [French Revolutionary Wars]
 Siege of Angers – 1793 – Virée de Galerne (War in the Vendée) [French Revolutionary Wars]
 Battle of Le Mans (1793) – 1793 – Virée de Galerne (War in the Vendée) [French Revolutionary Wars]
 Battle of Froeschwiller (1793) – 1793 – War of the First Coalition (French Revolutionary Wars)
 Battle of Collioure – 1793 – War of the First Coalition (French Revolutionary Wars)
 Battle of Savenay – 1793 – Virée de Galerne (War in the Vendée) [French Revolutionary Wars]
 Second Battle of Wissembourg (1793) – 1793 – War of the First Coalition (French Revolutionary Wars)
 Battle of Sans Culottes Camp – 1794 – War of the First Coalition (French Revolutionary Wars)
 Battle of Martinique (1794) – 1794 – War of the First Coalition (French Revolutionary Wars)
 Siege of San Fiorenzo – 1794 – War of the First Coalition (French Revolutionary Wars)
 Battle of Le Cateau (1794) – 1794 – War of the First Coalition (French Revolutionary Wars)
 Siege of Bastia – 1794 – War of the First Coalition (French Revolutionary Wars)
 Siege of Landrecies (1794) – 1794 – War of the First Coalition (French Revolutionary Wars)
 Battle of Villers-en-Cauchies – 1794 – War of the First Coalition (French Revolutionary Wars)
 Second Battle of Saorgio (1794) – 1794 – War of the First Coalition (French Revolutionary Wars)
 Battle of Beaumont (1794) – 1794 – War of the First Coalition (French Revolutionary Wars)
 Siege of Collioure (1794) – 1794 – War of the First Coalition (French Revolutionary Wars)
 Battle of Tourcoing – 1794 – War of the First Coalition (French Revolutionary Wars)
 Siege of Calvi – 1794 – War of the First Coalition (French Revolutionary Wars)
 Recapture of Landrecies – 1794 – War of the First Coalition (French Revolutionary Wars)
 Action of 8 March 1795 – 1795 – War of the First Coalition (French Revolutionary Wars)
 Battle of Groix – 1795 – War of the First Coalition (French Revolutionary Wars)
 Battle of Quiberon (1795) – 1795 – War of the First Coalition (French Revolutionary Wars)
 Action of 24 June 1795 – 1795 – War of the First Coalition (French Revolutionary Wars)
 Battle of the Hyères Islands – 1795 – War of the First Coalition (French Revolutionary Wars)
 13 Vendémiaire – 1795 – War of the First Coalition (French Revolutionary Wars)
 Battle of Saint-Aubin-du-Cormier (1796) – 1796 – Chouannerie (French Revolutionary Wars)
 Action of 18 June 1799 – 1799 – Mediterranean campaign of 1798 (War of the Second Coalition) [French Revolutionary Wars]
 Battle of the Tombettes – 1800 – Chouannerie (French Revolutionary Wars)
 USS Boston vs Berceau – 1800 – Quasi-War (French Revolutionary Wars)
 Raid on Boulogne – 1804 – War of the Third Coalition (Napoleonic Wars)
 Battle of Diamond Rock – 1805 – Anglo-Spanish War (1796–1808) and Trafalgar campaign (War of the Third Coalition) [French Revolutionary and Napoleonic Wars]
 Battle of Blanc-Nez and Gris-Nez – 1805 – War of the Third Coalition (Napoleonic Wars)
 Battle of the Basque Roads – 1809 – Napoleonic Wars
 Battle of the Bidassoa – 1813 – Campaign in south-west France (1814) (Peninsular War and War of the Sixth Coalition) [Napoleonic Wars]
 Battle of Nivelle – 1813 – Campaign in south-west France (1814) (Peninsular War and War of the Sixth Coalition) [Napoleonic Wars]
 Battle of Typee Valley – 1813 – War of 1812 (Sixty Years' War)
 Battle of the Nive – 1813 – Campaign in south-west France (1814) (Peninsular War and War of the Sixth Coalition) [Napoleonic Wars]
 Siege of Metz (1814) – 1814 – Campaign in north-east France (1814) (War of the Sixth Coalition) [Napoleonic Wars]
 First Battle of Bar-sur-Aube – 1814 – Campaign in north-east France (1814) (War of the Sixth Coalition) [Napoleonic Wars]
 Battle of Brienne – 1814 – Campaign in north-east France (1814) (War of the Sixth Coalition) [Napoleonic Wars]
 Battle of La Rothière – 1814 – Campaign in north-east France (1814) (War of the Sixth Coalition) [Napoleonic Wars]
 Battle of Lesmont – 1814 – Campaign in north-east France (1814) (War of the Sixth Coalition) [Napoleonic Wars]
 Battle of Champaubert – 1814 – Six Days' Campaign (Campaign in north-east France (1814)) [War of the Sixth Coalition] [Napoleonic Wars]
 Battle of Montmirail – 1814 – Six Days' Campaign (Campaign in north-east France (1814)) [War of the Sixth Coalition] [Napoleonic Wars]
 Battle of Château-Thierry (1814) – 1814 – Six Days' Campaign (Campaign in north-east France (1814)) [War of the Sixth Coalition] [Napoleonic Wars]
 Battle of Vauchamps – 1814 – Six Days' Campaign (Campaign in north-east France (1814)) [War of the Sixth Coalition] [Napoleonic Wars]
 Battle of Garris – 1814 – Campaign in south-west France (1814) (Peninsular War and War of the Sixth Coalition) [Napoleonic Wars]
 Battle of Mormant – 1814 – Campaign in north-east France (1814) (War of the Sixth Coalition) [Napoleonic Wars]
 Battle of Montereau – 1814 – Campaign in north-east France (1814) (War of the Sixth Coalition) [Napoleonic Wars]
 Battle of Orthez – 1814 – Campaign in south-west France (1814) (Peninsular War and War of the Sixth Coalition) [Napoleonic Wars]
 Battle of Bar-sur-Aube – 1814 – Campaign in north-east France (1814) (War of the Sixth Coalition) [Napoleonic Wars]
 Battle of Gué-à-Tresmes – 1814 – Campaign in north-east France (1814) (War of the Sixth Coalition) [Napoleonic Wars]
 Battle of Saint-Julien (1814) – 1814 – Campaign in north-east France (1814) (War of the Sixth Coalition) [Napoleonic Wars]
 Battle of Laubressel – 1814 – Campaign in north-east France (1814) (War of the Sixth Coalition) [Napoleonic Wars]
 Battle of Craonne – 1814 – Campaign in north-east France (1814) (War of the Sixth Coalition) [Napoleonic Wars]
 Battle of Laon – 1814 – Campaign in north-east France (1814) (War of the Sixth Coalition) [Napoleonic Wars]
 Battle of Mâcon (1814) – 1814 – Campaign in north-east France (1814) (War of the Sixth Coalition) [Napoleonic Wars]
 Battle of Reims – 1814 – Campaign in north-east France (1814) (War of the Sixth Coalition) [Napoleonic Wars]
 Battle of Limonest – 1814 – Campaign in north-east France (1814) (War of the Sixth Coalition) [Napoleonic Wars]
 Battle of Arcis-sur-Aube – 1814 – Campaign in north-east France (1814) (War of the Sixth Coalition) [Napoleonic Wars]
 Battle of Fère-Champenoise – 1814 – Campaign in north-east France (1814) (War of the Sixth Coalition) [Napoleonic Wars]
 Battle of Saint-Dizier – 1814 – Campaign in north-east France (1814) (War of the Sixth Coalition) [Napoleonic Wars]
 Battle of Paris (1814) – 1814 – Campaign in north-east France (1814) (War of the Sixth Coalition) [Napoleonic Wars]
 Battle of Toulouse – 1814 – Campaign in south-west France (1814) (Peninsular War and War of the Sixth Coalition) [Napoleonic Wars]
 Battle of Bayonne – 1814 – Campaign in south-west France (1814) (Peninsular War and War of the Sixth Coalition) [Napoleonic Wars]
 Battle of Rocheserviere – 1815 – Hundred Days (Napoleonic Wars)
 Battle of La Suffel – 1815 – Hundred Days (Napoleonic Wars)
 Battle of Rocquencourt – 1815 – Hundred Days (Napoleonic Wars)
 Battle of Issy – 1815 – Hundred Days (Napoleonic Wars)
 Invasion of Guadeloupe (1815) – 1815 – Hundred Days (Napoleonic Wars)
 Battle of Wörth – 1870 – Franco-Prussian War
 Battle of Gravelotte – 1870 – Franco-Prussian War
 Battle of Sedan – 1870 – Franco-Prussian War
 Battle of the Frontiers – 1914 – World War I
 First Battle of the Marne – 1914 – World War I
 First Battle of the Aisne – 1914 – World War I
 Battle of La Bassée – 1914 – World War I
 First Battle of Champagne – 1914–1915 – World War I
 First Battle of Artois – 1915-1915 – World War I
 Battle of Neuve Chapelle – 1915 – World War I
 Second Battle of Artois – 1915 – World War I
 Second Battle of Champagne – 1915 – World War I
 Battle of Loos – 1915 – World War I
 Third Battle of Artois – 1915 – World War I
 Battle of Verdun – 1916 – World War I
 Battle of Delville Wood – 1916 – World War I
 Battle of the Somme – 1916 – World War I
 Battle of Arras – 1917 – World War I
 Battle of Vimy Ridge – 1917 – World War I
 Second Battle of the Aisne – 1917 – World War I
 Battle of Messines – 1917 – World War I
 Battle of Cambrai – 1917 – World War I
 Battle of Dunkirk – 1940 – World War II
 Battle of France – 1940 – World War II
 D-Day – 1944 – World War II
 Battle of Normandy – 1944 – World War II

Germany
 Battle of Arbalo – 11 BC – Roman campaigns in Germania (12 BC – AD 16) (Roman–Germanic wars)
 Battle of the Lupia River – 11 BC – Roman campaigns in Germania (12 BC – AD 16) (Roman–Germanic wars)
 Battle of the Teutoburg Forest – 9 AD – Roman campaigns in Germania (12 BC – AD 16) (Roman–Germanic wars)
 Battle at Pontes Longi – 15 AD – Roman campaigns in Germania (12 BC – AD 16) (Roman–Germanic wars)
 Battle of Idistaviso – 16 AD – Roman campaigns in Germania (12 BC – AD 16) (Roman–Germanic wars)
 Battle of the Angrivarian Wall – 16 AD – Roman campaigns in Germania (12 BC – AD 16) (Roman–Germanic wars)
 Battle at the Harzhorn – c. 235 – Crisis of the Third Century and Roman–Germanic wars
 Battle of Solicinium – 368 – Roman–Germanic wars
 Battle of Tolbiac – 496 – Clovis I's campaigns
 Battle of the Unstrut River (531) – 531
 Battle of Cologne – 716 – Frankish Civil War and Frisian–Frankish wars
 Battle of Süntel – 782 – Saxon Wars
 Battle of Bornhöved (798) – 798 – Saxon Wars
 Battle of Eisenach (908) – 908 – Hungarian invasions of Europe
 Battle of Lechfeld (910) – 910 – Hungarian invasions of Europe
 Battle of Rednitz – 910 – Hungarian invasions of Europe
 Battle of the Inn – 913 – Hungarian invasions of Europe
 Battle of Püchen – 919 – Hungarian invasions of Europe
 Battle of Lenzen – 929
 Battle of Riade – 933 – Hungarian invasions of Europe
 Battle of Lechfeld – 955 – Hungarian invasions of Europe
 Battle of Mellrichstadt – 1078 – Great Saxon Revolt
 Battle of Flarchheim – 1080 – Great Saxon Revolt
 Battle on the Elster – 1080 – Great Saxon Revolt
 Battle of Pleichfeld – 1086 – Great Saxon Revolt
 Battle of Worringen – 1288 – War of the Limburg Succession
 Battle of Hiltersried – 1433 – Hussite Wars
 Siege of Neuss – 1474 – 1475 – Burgundian Wars
 Battle of Hemmingstedt – 1500
 Battle of Wenzenbach – 1504 – War of the Succession of Landshut
 Battle of Wurzach – 1524 – German Peasants' War
 Battle of Frankenhausen – 1525 – German Peasants' War
 Battle of Mühlberg – 1547 – Schmalkaldic War (European wars of religion)
 Battle of Drakenburg – 1547 – Schmalkaldic War (European wars of religion)
 Battle of Sievershausen – 1553 – Second Margrave War
 Siege of Hof – 1553 – Second Margrave War
 Battle of Rügen (1565) – 1565 – Northern Seven Years' War (Dano-Swedish War and Polish–Swedish wars)
 Action of 4 June 1565 – 1565 – Northern Seven Years' War (Dano-Swedish War and Polish–Swedish wars)
 Battle of Dahlen – 1568 – Eighty Years' War, 1566–1572 (Eighty Years' War) [European wars of religion]
 Battle of Jemmingen – 1568 – Eighty Years' War, 1566–1572 (Eighty Years' War) [European wars of religion]
 Siege of Godesberg – 1583 – Cologne War (European wars of religion)
 Battle of Werl – 1585 – Cologne War (European wars of religion)
 Destruction of Neuss – 1586 – Cologne War and Eighty Years' War, 1579–1588 (Eighty Years' War) [European wars of religion]
 Siege of Rheinberg (1586–1590) – 1586 – 1590 – Cologne War, Anglo-Spanish War (1585–1604) and Eighty Years' War, 1579–1588 (Eighty Years' War) [European wars of religion]
 Battle of the Lippe – 1595 – Anglo-Spanish War (1585–1604) and Ten Years (Eighty Years' War) (Eighty Years' War) [European wars of religion]
 Siege of Rheinberg (1597) – 1597 – Anglo-Spanish War (1585–1604) and Ten Years (Eighty Years' War) (Eighty Years' War) [European wars of religion]
 Siege of Meurs (1597) – 1597 – Anglo-Spanish War (1585–1604) and Ten Years (Eighty Years' War) (Eighty Years' War) [European wars of religion]
 Siege of Lingen (1597) – 1597 – Anglo-Spanish War (1585–1604) and Ten Years (Eighty Years' War) (Eighty Years' War) [European wars of religion]
 Siege of Schenckenschans (1599) – 1599 – Anglo-Spanish War (1585–1604) and Eighty Years' War, 1599–1609 (Eighty Years' War) [European wars of religion]
 Siege of Rees (1599) – 1599 – Anglo-Spanish War (1585–1604) and Eighty Years' War, 1599–1609 (Eighty Years' War) [European wars of religion]
 Siege of Rheinberg (1601) – 1601 – Anglo-Spanish War (1585–1604) and Eighty Years' War, 1599–1609 (Eighty Years' War) [European wars of religion]
 Siege of Jülich (1610) – 1610 – War of the Jülich Succession (Eighty Years' War) [European wars of religion]
 Siege of Aachen (1614) – 1614 – War of the Jülich Succession (Eighty Years' War) [European wars of religion]
 Siege of Bad Kreuznach – 1620 – Palatinate campaign (Thirty Years' War)
 Capture of Oppenheim – 1620 – Palatinate campaign (Thirty Years' War)
 Capture of Bacharach – 1620 – Palatinate campaign (Thirty Years' War)
 Siege of Frankenthal – 1621 – 1623 – Palatinate campaign (Thirty Years' War)
 Siege of Jülich (1621–1622) – 1621 – 1622 – Eighty Years' War, 1621–1648 (Eighty Years' War and Thirty Years' War) [European wars of religion]
 Battle of Mingolsheim – 1622 – Palatinate campaign (Thirty Years' War)
 Battle of Wimpfen – 1622 – Palatinate campaign (Thirty Years' War)
 Battle of Höchst – 1622 – Palatinate campaign (Thirty Years' War)
 Siege of Heidelberg (1622) – 1622 – Palatinate campaign (Thirty Years' War)
 Capture of Mannheim – 1622 – Palatinate campaign (Thirty Years' War)
 Battle of Stadtlohn – 1623 – Palatinate campaign (Thirty Years' War)
 Battle of Dessau Bridge – 1626 – Thirty Years' War
 Battle of Lutter – 1626 – Thirty Years' War
 Siege of Stralsund (1628) – 1628 – Thirty Years' War
 Battle of Wolgast – 1628 – Thirty Years' War
 Battle of Frankfurt an der Oder – 1631 – Swedish intervention in the Thirty Years' War (Thirty Years' War)
 Sack of Magdeburg – 1631 – Swedish intervention in the Thirty Years' War (Thirty Years' War)
 Battle of Werben – 1631 – Swedish intervention in the Thirty Years' War (Thirty Years' War)
 Battle of Breitenfeld (1631)) – 1631 – Swedish intervention in the Thirty Years' War (Thirty Years' War)
 Battle of Bamberg – 1632 – Swedish intervention in the Thirty Years' War (Thirty Years' War)
 Battle of Rain – 1632 – Swedish intervention in the Thirty Years' War (Thirty Years' War)
 Siege of Nuremberg – 1632 – Swedish intervention in the Thirty Years' War (Thirty Years' War)
 Battle of Wiesloch (1632) – 1632 – Swedish intervention in the Thirty Years' War (Thirty Years' War)
 Battle of the Alte Veste – 1632 – Swedish intervention in the Thirty Years' War (Thirty Years' War)
 Battle of Fürth – 1632 – Swedish intervention in the Thirty Years' War (Thirty Years' War)
 Battle of Lützen (1632) – 1632 – Swedish intervention in the Thirty Years' War (Thirty Years' War)
 Battle of Oldendorf – 1633 – Swedish intervention in the Thirty Years' War (Thirty Years' War)
 Battle of Nördlingen (1634) – 1634 – Swedish intervention in the Thirty Years' War (Thirty Years' War)
 Battle of Strasbourg Bridge – 1634 – Swedish intervention in the Thirty Years' War (Thirty Years' War)
 Siege of Schenkenschans – 1635 – 1636 – Eighty Years' War, 1621–1648 (Eighty Years' War and Thirty Years' War) [European wars of religion]
 Battle of Wittstock – 1636 – Thirty Years' War
 Battle of Rheinfelden – 1638 – Thirty Years' War
 Battle of Breisach – 1638 – Thirty Years' War
 Battle of Vlotho – 1638 – Thirty Years' War
 Battle of Chemnitz – 1639 – Thirty Years' War
 Battle of Wolfenbüttel – 1641 – Thirty Years' War
 Siege of Dorsten – 1641 – Hessian War (Thirty Years' War)
 Battle of Kempen – 1642 – Thirty Years' War
 Battle of Breitenfeld (1642) – 1642 – Thirty Years' War
 Battle of Tuttlingen – 1643 – Franco-Spanish War (1635–1659) (Thirty Years' War)
 Battle of Colberger Heide – 1644 – Torstenson War (Thirty Years' War)
 Battle of Freiburg – 1644 – Thirty Years' War
 Siege of Philippsburg (1644) – 1644 – Thirty Years' War
 Battle of Fehmarn (1644) – Torstenson War (Thirty Years' War)
 Battle of Jüterbog – 1644 – Thirty Years' War
 Battle of Herbsthausen – 1645 – Thirty Years' War
 Battle of Nördlingen (1645)) – 1645 – Thirty Years' War
 Battle of Zusmarshausen – 1648 – Thirty Years' War
 Battle of Wevelinghoven – 1648 – Thirty Years' War
 Siege of Bonn (1673) – 1673 – Franco-Dutch War
 Battle of Sinsheim – 1674 – Franco-Dutch War
 Battle of Rathenow – 1675 – Swedish invasion of Brandenburg (1674–75) (Scanian War) [Franco-Dutch War and Northern Wars]
 Battle of Nauen – 1675 – Swedish invasion of Brandenburg (1674–75) (Scanian War) [Franco-Dutch War and Northern Wars]
 Battle of Fehrbellin – 1675 – Swedish invasion of Brandenburg (1674–75) (Scanian War) [Franco-Dutch War and Northern Wars]
 Battle of Salzbach – 1675 – Franco-Dutch War
 Battle of Altenheim – 1675 – Franco-Dutch War
 Battle of Konzer Brücke – 1675 – Franco-Dutch War
 Siege of Philippsburg (1676) – 1676 – Franco-Dutch War
 Battle of Warksow – 1678 – Scanian War (Franco-Dutch War and Northern Wars)
 Battle of Ortenbach – 1678 – Franco-Dutch War
 Siege of Stralsund (1678) – 1678 – Scanian War (Franco-Dutch War and Northern Wars)
 Invasion of Rügen (1678) – 1678 – Scanian War (Franco-Dutch War and Northern Wars)
 Siege of Philippsburg (1688) – 1688 – Nine Years' War
 Siege of Bonn (1689) – 1689 – Nine Years' War
 First siege of Tönning – 1700 – Great Northern War (Northern Wars)
 Battle of Reinbek – 1700 – Great Northern War (Northern Wars)
 Siege of Kaiserswerth – 1702 – War of the Spanish Succession
 Siege of Landau (1702) – 1702 – War of the Spanish Succession
 Battle of Friedlingen – 1702 – War of the Spanish Succession
 Siege of Kehl (1703) – 1703 – War of the Spanish Succession
 Siege of Bonn (1703) – 1703 – War of the Spanish Succession
 First Battle of Höchstädt – 1703 – War of the Spanish Succession
 Battle of Speyerbach – 1703 – War of the Spanish Succession
 Battle of Schellenberg – 1704 – War of the Spanish Succession
 Battle of Blenheim – 1704 – War of the Spanish Succession
 Sendling's night of murder – 1705 – War of the Spanish Succession
 Siege of Stralsund (1711–1715) – 1711 – 1715 – Great Northern War (Northern Wars)
 Battle of Wismar (1711) – 1711 – Great Northern War (Northern Wars)
 Battle of Gadebusch – 1712 – Great Northern War (Northern Wars)
 Second siege of Tönning – 1713 – 1714 – Great Northern War (Northern Wars)
 Battle of Fehmarn (1715) – 1715 – Great Northern War (Northern Wars)
 Battle of Rügen (1715) – 1715 – Great Northern War (Northern Wars)
 Battle of Stresow – 1715 – Great Northern War (Northern Wars)
 Siege of Kehl (1733) – 1733 – War of the Polish Succession
 Siege of Trarbach – 1734 – War of the Polish Succession
 Siege of Philippsburg (1734) – 1734 – War of the Polish Succession
 Battle of Clausen – 1735 – War of the Polish Succession
 Battle of Simbach – 1743 – War of the Austrian Succession
 Battle of Dettingen – 1743 – War of the Austrian Succession
 Battle of Pfaffenhofen – 1745 – War of the Austrian Succession
 Battle of Kesselsdorf – 1745 – Second Silesian War (War of the Austrian Succession and Silesian Wars)
 Siege of Pirna – 1756 – Third Silesian War (Seven Years' War)
 Battle of Hastenbeck – 1757 – Seven Years' War
 1757 raid on Berlin – 1757 – Third Silesian War (Seven Years' War)
 Battle of Rossbach – 1757 – Third Silesian War (Seven Years' War)
 Blockade of Stralsund – 1757 – 1758 – Pomeranian War (Seven Years' War)
 Battle of Rheinberg – 1758 – Seven Years' War
 Battle of Krefeld – 1758 – Seven Years' War
 Battle of Tornow – 1758 – Pomeranian War (Seven Years' War)
 Battle of Fehrbellin (1758) – 1758 – Pomeranian War (Seven Years' War)
 First siege of Kolberg (Seven Years' War) – 1758 – Pomeranian War (Seven Years' War)
 Battle of Lutterberg (1758) – 1758 – Seven Years' War
 Battle of Hochkirch – 1758 – Third Silesian War (Seven Years' War)
 Battle of Güstow – 1758 – Pomeranian War (Seven Years' War)
 Battle of Bergen (1759) – 1759 – Seven Years' War
 Battle of Minden – 1759 – Seven Years' War
 Battle of Frisches Haff – 1759 – Pomeranian War (Seven Years' War)
 Battle of Hoyerswerda – 1759 – Third Silesian War (Seven Years' War)
 Battle of Maxen – 1759 – Third Silesian War (Seven Years' War)
 Battle of Meissen – 1759 – Third Silesian War (Seven Years' War)
 Battle of Corbach – 1760 – Seven Years' War
 Siege of Dresden – 1760 – Third Silesian War (Seven Years' War)
 Battle of Emsdorf – 1760 – Seven Years' War
 Battle of Warburg – 1760 – Seven Years' War
 Battle of Strehla – 1760 – Third Silesian War (Seven Years' War)
 Second siege of Kolberg (Seven Years' War) – 1760 – Pomeranian War (Seven Years' War)
 Raid on Berlin – 1760 – Third Silesian War (Seven Years' War)
 Battle of Pasewalk – 1760 – Pomeranian War (Seven Years' War)
 Battle of Kloster Kampen – 1760 – Seven Years' War
 Battle of Torgau – 1760 – Third Silesian War (Seven Years' War)
 Battle of Langensalza (1761) – 1761 – Seven Years' War
 Siege of Cassel (1761) – 1761 – Seven Years' War
 Battle of Grünberg – 1761 – Seven Years' War
 Battle of Villinghausen – 1761 – Seven Years' War
 Third siege of Kolberg (Seven Years' War) – 1761 – Pomeranian War (Seven Years' War)
 Battle of Neuensund – 1761 – Pomeranian War (Seven Years' War)
 Battle of Ölper (1761) – 1761 – Seven Years' War
 Battle of Neukalen – 1762 – Pomeranian War (Seven Years' War)
 Battle of Wilhelmsthal – 1762 – Seven Years' War
 Battle of Lutterberg (1762) – 1762 – Seven Years' War
 Battle of Nauheim – 1762 – Seven Years' War
 Siege of Cassel (1762) – 1762 – Seven Years' War
 Battle of Freiberg – 1762 – Third Silesian War (Seven Years' War)
 Siege of Mainz (1792) – 1792 – War of the First Coalition (French Revolutionary Wars)
 Battle of Limburg (1792) – 1792 – War of the First Coalition (French Revolutionary Wars)
 Battle of Aldenhoven (1793) – 1793 – War of the First Coalition (French Revolutionary Wars)
 Siege of Mainz (1793) – 1793 – War of the First Coalition (French Revolutionary Wars)
 Siege of Landau (1793) – 1793 – War of the First Coalition (French Revolutionary Wars)
 Battle of Pirmasens – 1793 – War of the First Coalition (French Revolutionary Wars)
 Battle of Bergzabern – 1793 – War of the First Coalition (French Revolutionary Wars)
 Battle of Friedberg (Hessen) – 1793 – War of the First Coalition (French Revolutionary Wars)
 Battle of Biesingen – 1793 – War of the First Coalition (French Revolutionary Wars)
 Battle of Kaiserslautern – 1793 – War of the First Coalition (French Revolutionary Wars)
 Battle of Kaiserslautern (1794) – 1794 – War of the First Coalition (French Revolutionary Wars)
 Battle of Trippstadt – 1794 – War of the First Coalition (French Revolutionary Wars)
 Battle of Aldenhoven (1794) – 1794 – War of the First Coalition (French Revolutionary Wars)
 Battle of Handschuhsheim – 1795 – War of the First Coalition (French Revolutionary Wars)
 Battle of Höchst (1795) – 1795 – War of the First Coalition (French Revolutionary Wars)
 Action at Mannheim (1795) – 1795 – War of the First Coalition (French Revolutionary Wars)
 Battle of Mainz – 1795 – War of the First Coalition (French Revolutionary Wars)
 Battle of Pfeddersheim (1795) – 1795 – War of the First Coalition (French Revolutionary Wars)
 Battle of Siegburg – 1796 – War of the First Coalition (French Revolutionary Wars)
 Battle of Altenkirchen – 1796 – War of the First Coalition (French Revolutionary Wars)
 Battle of Maudach – 1796 – War of the First Coalition (French Revolutionary Wars)
 Battle of Wetzlar (1796) – 1796 – War of the First Coalition (French Revolutionary Wars)
 Battle of Kircheib – 1796 – War of the First Coalition (French Revolutionary Wars)
 Battle of Kehl (1796) – 1796 – War of the First Coalition (French Revolutionary Wars)
 Battle of Rastatt (1796) – 1796 – War of the First Coalition (French Revolutionary Wars)
 Battle of Ettlingen – 1796 – War of the First Coalition (French Revolutionary Wars)
 Battle of Neresheim – 1796 – War of the First Coalition (French Revolutionary Wars)
 Battle of Theiningen – 1796 – War of the First Coalition (French Revolutionary Wars)
 Battle of Amberg – 1796 – War of the First Coalition (French Revolutionary Wars)
 Battle of Friedberg (Bavaria) – 1796 – War of the First Coalition (French Revolutionary Wars)
 Battle of Würzburg – 1796 – War of the First Coalition (French Revolutionary Wars)
 Battle of Limburg (1796) – 1796 – War of the First Coalition (French Revolutionary Wars)
 Second Battle of Kehl (1796) – 1796 – War of the First Coalition (French Revolutionary Wars)
 Battle of Biberach (1796) – 1796 – War of the First Coalition (French Revolutionary Wars)
 Battle of Emmendingen – 1796 – War of the First Coalition (French Revolutionary Wars)
 Battle of Schliengen – 1796 – War of the First Coalition (French Revolutionary Wars)
 Siege of Kehl (1796–1797) – 1796 – 1797 – War of the First Coalition (French Revolutionary Wars)
 Siege of Hüningen (1796–1797) – 1796 – 1797 – War of the First Coalition (French Revolutionary Wars)
 Battle of Neuwied (1797) – 1797 – War of the First Coalition (French Revolutionary Wars)
 Battle of Diersheim (1797) – 1797 – War of the First Coalition (French Revolutionary Wars)
 Battle of Ostrach – 1799 – War of the Second Coalition (French Revolutionary Wars)
 Battle of Stockach (1799) – 1799 – War of the Second Coalition (French Revolutionary Wars)
 Battle of Mannheim (1799) – 1799 – War of the Second Coalition (French Revolutionary Wars)
 Battle of Wiesloch (1799) – 1799 – War of the Second Coalition (French Revolutionary Wars)
 Battles of Stockach and Engen – 1800 – War of the Second Coalition (French Revolutionary Wars)
 Battle of Messkirch – 1800 – War of the Second Coalition (French Revolutionary Wars)
 Battle of Biberach (1800) – 1800 – War of the Second Coalition (French Revolutionary Wars)
 Battle of Höchstädt (1800) – 1800 – War of the Second Coalition (French Revolutionary Wars)
 Battle of Neuburg (1800) – 1800 – War of the Second Coalition (French Revolutionary Wars)
 Battle of Ampfing (1800) – 1800 – War of the Second Coalition (French Revolutionary Wars)
 Battle of Hohenlinden – 1800 – War of the Second Coalition (French Revolutionary Wars)
 Battle of Donauwörth – 1805 – Ulm campaign (War of the Third Coalition) [Napoleonic Wars]
 Battle of Wertingen – 1805 – Ulm campaign (War of the Third Coalition) [Napoleonic Wars]
 Battle of Günzburg – 1805 – Ulm campaign (War of the Third Coalition) [Napoleonic Wars]
 Battle of Haslach-Jungingen – 1805 – Ulm campaign (War of the Third Coalition) [Napoleonic Wars]
 Battle of Memmingen – 1805 – Ulm campaign (War of the Third Coalition) [Napoleonic Wars]
 Battle of Elchingen – 1805 – Ulm campaign (War of the Third Coalition) [Napoleonic Wars]
 Battle of Ulm – 1805 – Ulm campaign (War of the Third Coalition) [Napoleonic Wars]
 Battle of Schleiz – 1806 – War of the Fourth Coalition (Napoleonic Wars)
 Battle of Saalfeld – 1806 – War of the Fourth Coalition (Napoleonic Wars)
 Battle of Jena-Auerstedt – 1806 – War of the Fourth Coalition (Napoleonic Wars)
 Battle of Halle – 1806 – War of the Fourth Coalition (Napoleonic Wars)
 Siege of Magdeburg (1806) – 1806 – War of the Fourth Coalition (Napoleonic Wars)
 Fall of Berlin (1806) – 1806 – War of the Fourth Coalition (Napoleonic Wars)
 Battle of Prenzlau – 1806 – War of the Fourth Coalition (Napoleonic Wars)
 Battle of Waren-Nossentin – 1806 – War of the Fourth Coalition (Napoleonic Wars)
 Battle of Lübeck – 1806 – War of the Fourth Coalition and Franco-Swedish War (Napoleonic Wars)
 Siege of Hamelin – 1806 – War of the Fourth Coalition (Napoleonic Wars)
 Siege of Stralsund (1807) – 1807 – Franco-Swedish War (Napoleonic Wars)
 Battle of Teugen-Hausen – 1809 – War of the Fifth Coalition (Napoleonic Wars)
 Battle of Abensberg – 1809 – War of the Fifth Coalition (Napoleonic Wars)
 Battle of Landshut (1809) – 1809 – War of the Fifth Coalition (Napoleonic Wars)
 Battle of Eckmühl – 1809 – War of the Fifth Coalition (Napoleonic Wars)
 Battle of Ratisbon – 1809 – War of the Fifth Coalition (Napoleonic Wars)
 Battle of Neumarkt-Sankt Veit – 1809 – War of the Fifth Coalition (Napoleonic Wars)
 Battle of Stralsund (1809) – 1809 – Franco-Swedish War and Dano-Swedish War of 1808–1809 (Napoleonic Wars)
 Battle of Gefrees – 1809 – War of the Fifth Coalition (Napoleonic Wars)
 Battle of Halberstadt – 1809 – War of the Fifth Coalition (Napoleonic Wars)
 Battle of Ölper (1809) – 1809 – War of the Fifth Coalition (Napoleonic Wars)
 Battle of Lüneburg – 1813 – German campaign of 1813 (War of the Sixth Coalition) [Napoleonic Wars]
 Battle of Möckern – 1813 – German campaign of 1813 (War of the Sixth Coalition) [Napoleonic Wars]
 Battle of Lützen (1813) – 1813 – German campaign of 1813 (War of the Sixth Coalition) [Napoleonic Wars]
 Battle of Bautzen (1813) – 1813 – German campaign of 1813 (War of the Sixth Coalition) [Napoleonic Wars]
 Battle of Luckau – 1813 – German campaign of 1813 (War of the Sixth Coalition) [Napoleonic Wars]
 Battle of Großbeeren – 1813 – German campaign of 1813 (War of the Sixth Coalition) [Napoleonic Wars]
 Battle of Dresden – 1813 – German campaign of 1813 (War of the Sixth Coalition) [Napoleonic Wars]
 Battle of Hagelberg – 1813 – German campaign of 1813 (War of the Sixth Coalition) [Napoleonic Wars]
 Battle of Dennewitz – 1813 – German campaign of 1813 (War of the Sixth Coalition) [Napoleonic Wars]
 Battle of the Göhrde – 1813 – German campaign of 1813 (War of the Sixth Coalition) [Napoleonic Wars]
 Battle of Altenburg – 1813 – German campaign of 1813 (War of the Sixth Coalition) [Napoleonic Wars]
 Combat of Rosslau – 1813 – German campaign of 1813 (War of the Sixth Coalition) [Napoleonic Wars]
 Battle of Wartenburg – 1813 – German campaign of 1813 (War of the Sixth Coalition) [Napoleonic Wars]
 Siege of Dresden (1813) – 1813 – German campaign of 1813 (War of the Sixth Coalition) [Napoleonic Wars]
 Battle of Leipzig – 1813 – German campaign of 1813 (War of the Sixth Coalition) [Napoleonic Wars]
 Siege of Torgau – 1813 – 1814 – German campaign of 1813 (War of the Sixth Coalition) [Napoleonic Wars]
 Battle of Hanau – 1813 – German campaign of 1813 (War of the Sixth Coalition) [Napoleonic Wars]
 Battle of Bornhöved (1813) – 1813 – German campaign of 1813 (War of the Sixth Coalition) [Napoleonic Wars]
 Battle of Sehested – 1813 – German campaign of 1813 (War of the Sixth Coalition) [Napoleonic Wars]
 Siege of Hamburg – 1813 – 1814 – German campaign of 1813 (War of the Sixth Coalition) [Napoleonic Wars]
 Siege of Mainz (1814) – 1814 – German campaign of 1813 (War of the Sixth Coalition) [Napoleonic Wars]
 Battle of Aachen – 1944 – World War II
 Battle of Berlin – 1945 – World War II

Georgia

 Battle of the Pelorus – 65 BC – Caucasian campaign of Pompey (Third Mithridatic War) [Mithridatic Wars] [Crisis of the Roman Republic]
 Siege of Petra (541) – 541 – Lazic War (Roman–Persian Wars)
 Siege of Petra (549) – 549 – Lazic War (Roman–Persian Wars)
 Siege of Petra (550–551) – 550 – 551 – Lazic War (Roman–Persian Wars)
 Battle of Telephis–Ollaria – 554 – Lazic War (Roman–Persian Wars)
 Siege of Onoguris – 554 or 555 – Lazic War (Roman–Persian Wars)
 Siege of Phasis – 555 – 556 – Lazic War (Roman–Persian Wars)
 Battle of Sasireti – 1042 – Byzantine–Georgian wars
 Battle of Partskhisi – between 1073 and 1077 – Georgian–Seljuk wars
 Battle of Ertsukhi – 1104 – Georgian–Seljuk wars
 Battle of Didgori – 1121 – Georgian–Seljuk wars
 Siege of Tbilisi (1386) – 1386 – Timur's invasions of Georgia (Timurid conquests and invasions)
 Siege of Birtvisi (1403) – 1403 – Timur's invasions of Georgia (Timurid conquests and invasions)
 Battle of Garisi – 1556
 Battle of Digomi – 1567
 Battle of Tashiskari – 1609
 Battle of Tsitsamuri – 1615 – Kakhetian Uprising (1615)
 Battle of Marabda – 1625
 Battle of Martqopi – 1625
 Battle of Aghaiani – 1625 – Kartli-Kakhetian Uprising (1625)
 Battle of Bazaleti – 1626
 Battle of Khresili – 1757
 Battle of Aspindza – 1770 – Russo-Turkish War (1768–1774)
 Battle of Krtsanisi – 1795
 Battle of Akhaltsikhe – 1828 – Russo-Turkish War (1828–1829)

Ghana 

 Battle of Guinea – 1478 – War of the Castilian Succession
 Battle of Elmina (1625) – 1625 – Dutch–Portuguese War
 Battle of Elmina (1637) – 1637 – Dutch–Portuguese War

Greece
 Battle of Deres – c. 684 BC – Second Messenian War
 Battle of the Great Foss – c. 682 BC – Second Messenian War
 Battle of Hysiae (c.669 BC) – c. 669 BC
 Siege of Naxos (499 BC) – 499 BC – Greco-Persian Wars
 Siege of Eretria – 490 BC – First Persian invasion of Greece (Greco-Persian Wars)
 Battle of Marathon – 490 BC – First Persian invasion of Greece (Greco-Persian Wars)
 Battle of Thermopylae – 480 BC – Second Persian invasion of Greece (Greco-Persian Wars)
 Battle of Artemisium – 480 BC – Second Persian invasion of Greece (Greco-Persian Wars)
 Battle of Salamis – 480 BC – Second Persian invasion of Greece (Greco-Persian Wars)
 Achaemenid destruction of Athens – 480 BC – 479 BC – Second Persian invasion of Greece (Greco-Persian Wars)
 Battle of Plataea – 479 BC – Second Persian invasion of Greece (Greco-Persian Wars)
 Battle of Aegina – 458 BC – First Peloponnesian War
 Battle of Tanagra (457 BC) – 457 BC – First Peloponnesian War
 Battle of Oenophyta – 457 BC – First Peloponnesian War
 Battle of Coronea (447 BC) – 447 BC – First Peloponnesian War
 Battle of Sybota – 433 BC – Peloponnesian War
 Battle of Potidaea – 432 BC – Peloponnesian War
 Battle of Spartolos – 429 BC – Peloponnesian War
 Battle of Rhium – 429 BC – Peloponnesian War
 Battle of Naupactus – 429 BC – Peloponnesian War
 Siege of Plataea – 429 BC – 427 BC – Peloponnesian War
 Mytilenean revolt – 428 BC – 427 BC – Peloponnesian War
 Battle of Tanagra (426 BC) – 426 BC – Peloponnesian War
 Battle of Olpae – 426 BC – Peloponnesian War
 Battle of Idomene – 426 BC – Peloponnesian War
 Battle of Pylos – 425 BC – Peloponnesian War
 Battle of Sphacteria – 425 BC – Peloponnesian War
 Battle of Megara – 424 BC – Peloponnesian War
 Battle of Delium – 424 BC – Peloponnesian War
 Battle of Amphipolis – 422 BC – Peloponnesian War
 Battle of Mantinea (418 BC) – 418 BC – Peloponnesian War
 Battle of Hysiae (417 BC) – 417 BC – Peloponnesian War
 Battle of Orneae – 417 BC – Peloponnesian War
 Siege of Melos – 416 BC – Peloponnesian War
 Battle of Syme – 411 BC – Peloponnesian War
 Battle of Eretria – 411 BC – Peloponnesian War
 Battle of Mytilene (406 BC) – 406 BC – Peloponnesian War
 Battle of Haliartus – 395 BC – Corinthian War
 Battle of Nemea – 394 BC – Corinthian War
 Battle of Coronea (394 BC) – 394 BC – Corinthian War
 Battle of Lechaeum – 391 BC – Corinthian War
 Battle of Naxos – 376 BC – Boeotian War
 Battle of Tegyra – 375 BC
 Battle of Leuctra – 371 BC
 Battle of Cynoscephalae (364 BC) – 364 BC
 Battle of Mantinea (362 BC) – 362 BC – Theban–Spartan War
 Battle of Crocus Field – 353 BC or 352 BC – Third Sacred War and Rise of Macedon
 Battle of Chaeronea (338 BC) – 338 BC – Rise of Macedon
 Battle of Thebes – 335 BC – Alexander's Balkan campaign (Wars of Alexander the Great)
 Battle of Megalopolis – 331 BC – Wars of Alexander the Great
 Battle of Plataea (323 BC) – 323 BC – Lamian War
 Battle of Thermopylae (323 BC) – 323 BC – Lamian War
 Siege of Lamia – 322 BC – Lamian War
 Battle of Amorgos – 322 BC – Lamian War
 Battle of the Echinades (322 BC) – 322 BC – Lamian War
 Defeat of Leonnatus by Antiphilus – 322 BC – Lamian War
 Battle of Crannon – 322 BC – Lamian War
 Siege of Megalopolis – 317 BC – Second War of the Diadochi
 Siege of Rhodes (305–304 BC) – 305 BC – 304 BC – Fourth War of the Diadochi
 Siege of Athens (287 BC) – 287 BC
 Battle of Thermopylae (279 BC) – 279 BC – Gallic invasion of the Balkans
 Battle of Cos – 261 BC or 255 BC – Chremonidean War and Syrian Wars
 Battle of Andros (246 BC) – 246 BC or 245 BC – Third Syrian War
 Siege of Medion – 231 BC – First Illyrian War
 Battle of Paxos – 229 BC – First Illyrian War
 Siege of Corcyra – 229 BC – First Illyrian War
 Battle of Mount Lycaeum – 227 BC – Cleomenean War
 Battle of Ladoceia – 227 BC – Cleomenean War
 Battle of Dyme – 226 BC – Cleomenean War
 Battle of Sellasia – 222 BC – Cleomenean War
 First Battle of Lamia – 209 BC – First Macedonian War (Macedonian Wars)
 Second Battle of Lamia – 209 BC – First Macedonian War (Macedonian Wars)
 Battle of Mantinea (207 BC) – 207 BC – First Macedonian War (Macedonian Wars)
 Battle of Chios (201 BC) – 201 BC – Cretan War (205–200 BC)
 Battle of Cynoscephalae – 197 BC – Second Macedonian War (Macedonian Wars)
 Battle of Thermopylae (191 BC) – 191 BC – Roman–Seleucid War (Macedonian Wars)
 Battle of Callinicus – 171 BC – Third Macedonian War (Macedonian Wars)
 Battle of Pydna – 168 BC – Third Macedonian War (Macedonian Wars)
 Battle of Pydna (148 BC) – 148 BC – Fourth Macedonian War (Macedonian Wars)
 Siege of Rhodes (88 BC) – 88 BC – First Mithridatic War (Mithridatic Wars)
 Siege of Athens and Piraeus (87–86 BC) – 87 BC – 86 BC – First Mithridatic War (Mithridatic Wars)
 Battle of Chaeronea (86 BC) – 86 BC – First Mithridatic War (Mithridatic Wars)
 Battle of Orchomenus – 85 BC – First Mithridatic War (Mithridatic Wars)
 Battle of Lemnos (73 BCE) – 73 BC – Third Mithridatic War (Mithridatic Wars)
 Siege of Gomphi – 48 BC – Caesar's civil war
 Battle of Pharsalus – 48 BC – Caesar's civil war
 Siege of Thessalonica (254) – 254 – Roman–Germanic wars and Crisis of the Third Century
 Battle of Thermopylae (254) – 254 – Roman–Germanic wars and Crisis of the Third Century
 Sack of Athens (267 AD) – 267 – Crisis of the Third Century
 Battle of Thessalonica (380) – 380 – Gothic War (376–382) (Fall of the Western Roman Empire) and Roman–Germanic wars
 Siege of Thessalonica (617) – 617 or 618 – Avar–Byzantine wars
 Battle of Thasos – 829 – Arab–Byzantine wars
 Battle of the Gulf of Corinth – c. 873 – Arab–Byzantine wars
 Battle of Cephalonia – 880 – Arab–Byzantine wars
 Siege of Euripos – 883 – Arab–Byzantine wars
 Sack of Thessalonica (904) – 904 – Arab–Byzantine wars
 Siege of Chandax – 960 – 961 – Arab–Byzantine wars
 Battle of Thessalonica (995) – 995 – Byzantine conquest of Bulgaria (Byzantine–Bulgarian wars)
 Battle of Spercheios – 997 – Byzantine conquest of Bulgaria (Byzantine–Bulgarian wars)
 Battle of Thessalonica (1004) – 1004 – Byzantine conquest of Bulgaria (Byzantine–Bulgarian wars)
 Battle of Kreta – 1009 – Byzantine conquest of Bulgaria (Byzantine–Bulgarian wars)
 Battle of Thessalonica (1014) – 1014 – Byzantine conquest of Bulgaria (Byzantine–Bulgarian wars)
 Battle of Setina – 1017 – Byzantine conquest of Bulgaria (Byzantine–Bulgarian wars)
 Battle of Thessalonica (1040) – 1040 – Uprising of Peter Delyan (Byzantine–Bulgarian wars)
 Battle of Thessalonica (2nd 1040) – 1040 – Uprising of Peter Delyan (Byzantine–Bulgarian wars)
 Battle of Ostrovo – 1041 – Uprising of Peter Delyan (Byzantine–Bulgarian wars)
 Battle of Larissa – 1083 – First Norman invasion of the Balkans
 Sack of Thessalonica (1185) – 1185 – Third Norman invasion of the Balkans
 Battle of Demetritzes – 1185 – Third Norman invasion of the Balkans
 Battle of Serres – 1196 – Battles of the Second Bulgarian Empire (Byzantine–Bulgarian wars)
 Battle of Serres (1205) – 1205 – Bulgarian–Latin wars
 Battle of Messinopolis – 1207 – Bulgarian–Latin wars
 Battle of Settepozzi – 1263 – War of Saint Sabas
 Battle of Halmyros – 1311 – Catalan Company
 Battle of Picotin – 1316 – Ferdinand of Majorca
 Battle of Manolada – 1316 – Ferdinand of Majorca
 Battle of Demotika – 1352 – Byzantine civil war of 1352–1357 (Serbian-Ottoman wars) [Ottoman wars in Europe]
 Battle of Maritsa – 1371 – Serbian-Ottoman wars (Ottoman wars in Europe)
 Siege of Thessalonica (1422–1430) – 1422 – 1430 – Byzantine–Ottoman wars and Ottoman–Venetian wars
 Siege of Rhodes (1480) – 1480 – Ottoman wars in Europe
 Battle of Zonchio – 1499 – Ottoman–Venetian War (1499–1503) (Ottoman–Venetian wars)
 Battle of Modon (1500) – 1500 – Ottoman–Venetian War (1499–1503) (Ottoman–Venetian wars)
 Siege of the Castle of Saint George – 1500 – Ottoman–Venetian War (1499–1503) (Ottoman–Venetian wars)
 Siege of Rhodes (1522) – 1522 – Ottoman wars in Europe
 Siege of Corfu (1537) – 1537 – Ottoman–Venetian War (1537–1540) (Ottoman–Venetian wars)
 Battle of Preveza – 1538 – Ottoman–Venetian War (1537–1540) (Ottoman–Venetian wars)
 Battle of Lepanto – 1571 – Ottoman–Habsburg wars and Ottoman–Venetian War (1570–1573) (Ottoman–Venetian wars)
 Siege of Candia – 1648 – 1669 – Cretan War (1645–1669) (Ottoman–Venetian wars)
 Action of 10 July 1651 – 1651 – Cretan War (1645–1669) (Ottoman–Venetian wars)
 Action of 27 August 1661 – 1661 – Cretan War (1645–1669) (Ottoman–Venetian wars)
 Action of 29 September 1662 – 1662 – Cretan War (1645–1669) (Ottoman–Venetian wars)
 Siege of Santa Maura (1684) – 1684 – Morean War (Great Turkish War)
 Siege of the Acropolis (1687) – 1687 – Morean War (Great Turkish War)
 Siege of Negroponte (1688) – 1688 – Morean War (Great Turkish War)
 Battle of Mytilene (1690) – 1690 – Morean War (Great Turkish War)
 Battle of the Oinousses Islands – 1695 – Morean War (Great Turkish War)
 Battle of Andros (1696) – 1696 – Morean War (Great Turkish War)
 Battle of Samothrace (1698) – 1698 – Morean War (Great Turkish War)
 Siege of Nauplia (1715) – 1715 – Ottoman reconquest of the Morea (Ottoman–Venetian War (1714–1718))
 Siege of Corfu (1716) – 1716 – Ottoman–Venetian War (1714–1718)
 Action of 8 July 1716 – 1716 – Ottoman–Venetian War (1714–1718)
 Battle of Matapan – 1717 – Ottoman–Venetian War (1714–1718)
 Battle of Vromopigada – 1770 – Ottoman invasion of Mani (1770)
 Battle of Nauplia (1770) – 1770 – Russo-Turkish War (1768–1774)
 Battle of Chesma – 1770 – Russo-Turkish War (1768–1774)
 Battle of Patras (1772) – 1772 – Russo-Turkish War (1768–1774)
 Battle of Andros (1790) – 1790 – Russo-Turkish War (1787–1792)
 Battle of Mykonos – 1794 – War of the First Coalition (French Revolutionary Wars)
 Action of 18 August 1798 – 1798 – Mediterranean campaign of 1798 (War of the Second Coalition) [French Revolutionary Wars]
 Battle of Nicopolis (1798) – 1798 – French campaign in Egypt and Syria (War of the Second Coalition) [French Revolutionary Wars]
 Siege of Corfu (1798–1799) – 1798 – 1799 – Mediterranean campaign of 1798 (War of the Second Coalition) [French Revolutionary Wars]
 Battle of Athos – 1807 – Russo-Turkish War (1806–1812)
 Siege of Santa Maura (1810) – 1810 – Adriatic campaign of 1807–1814 (Napoleonic Wars)
 Liberation of Kalamata – 1821 – Greek War of Independence
 Navarino massacre – 1821 – Greek War of Independence
 Siege of Patras (1821) – 1821 – Greek War of Independence
 Siege of Tripolitsa – 1821 – Greek War of Independence
 Battle of Alamana – 1821 – Greek War of Independence
 Siege of the Acropolis (1821–1822) – 1821 – 1822 – Greek War of Independence
 Battle of Gravia Inn – 1821 – Greek War of Independence
 Battle of Valtetsi – 1821 – Greek War of Independence
 Battle of Doliana – 1821 – Greek War of Independence
 Battle of Lalas – 1821 – Greek War of Independence
 Battle of Vasilika (Thessaloniki) – 1821 – Greek War of Independence
 Battle of the Trench (1821) – 1821 – Greek War of Independence
 Massacre of Samothrace (1821) – 1821 – Greek War of Independence
 Battle of Vassilika – 1821 – Greek War of Independence
 Chios massacre – 1822 – Greek War of Independence
 Naousa massacre – 1822 – Greek War of Independence
 Battle of Peta – 1822 – Greek War of Independence
 Battle of Dervenakia – 1822 – Greek War of Independence
 Battle of Nauplia (1822) – 1822 – Greek War of Independence
 First siege of Missolonghi – 1822 – Greek War of Independence
 Battle of Karpenisi – 1823 – Greek War of Independence
 Second siege of Missolonghi – 1823 – Greek War of Independence
 Kasos Massacre – 1824 – Greek War of Independence
 Destruction of Psara – 1824 – Greek War of Independence
 Battle of Samos – 1824 – Greek War of Independence
 Battle of Gerontas – 1824 – Greek War of Independence
 Third siege of Missolonghi – 1825 – 1826 – Greek War of Independence
 Battle of Andros (1825) – 1825 – Greek War of Independence
 Battle of Sphacteria (1825) – 1825 – Greek War of Independence
 Battle of Maniaki – 1825 – Greek War of Independence
 Battle of the Lerna Mills – 1825 – Greek War of Independence
 Battle of Vergas – 1826 – Greek War of Independence
 Battle of Diro – 1826 – Greek War of Independence
 Battle of Polyaravos – 1826 – Greek War of Independence
 Siege of the Acropolis (1826–1827) – 1826 – 1827 – Greek War of Independence
 Battle of Arachova – 1826 – Greek War of Independence
 Battle of Kamatero – 1827 – Greek War of Independence
 Battle of Phaleron – 1827 – Greek War of Independence
 Battle of Itea – 1827 – Greek War of Independence
 Battle of Navarino – 1827 – Greek War of Independence
 Battle of Petra – 1829 – Greek War of Independence
 Battle of Giannitsa – 1912
 Battle of Lemnos (1912)
 Battle of Pente Pigadia – 1912
 Battle of Sarantaporo – 1912
 Battle of Bizani – 1913
 Battle of Kilkis-Lahanas – 1913
 Battle of Sorovich – 1916
 Battle of Skra-di-Legen – 1918
 Battle of Greece – 1940 or 1941
 Battle of Pindus – 1940
 Battle of Cape Matapan – 1941
 Battle of Crete – 1941
 Battle of Vevi (1941)
 Battle of Leros – 1943

Grenada 

 Capture of Grenada (1779) – 1779 – American Revolutionary War
 Battle of Grenada – 1779 – American Revolutionary War

Guyana 

 Raid on Essequibo and Demerara (1781) – 1781 – Fourth Anglo-Dutch War (American Revolutionary War)
 Capture of Demerara and Essequibo – 1782 – American Revolutionary War

Haiti 

 Capture of Fort Rocher – 1654 – Franco-Spanish War (1635–1659) (Thirty Years' War)
 Battle of Cap-Français – 1757 – Seven Years' War
 Battle of the Windward Passage – 1760 – Seven Years' War
 Action of 2 January 1783 – 1783 – American Revolutionary War
 Battle of Croix-des-Bouquets – 1792 – Haitian Revolution
 Siege of Port-au-Prince (1793) – 1793 – Haitian Revolution
 Battle of Cap-Français (1793) – 1793 – Haitian Revolution
 Capture of Fort-Dauphin (1794) – 1794 – Haitian Revolution and War of the First Coalition (French Revolutionary Wars)
 Battle of the Acul – 1794 – Haitian Revolution
 Battle of Saint-Raphaël – 1794 – Haitian Revolution
 Battle of Gonaïves – 1794 – Haitian Revolution
 Battle of Port-Républicain – 1794 – Haitian Revolution
 Battle of Jean-Rabel – 1797 – Haitian Revolution
 Action of 1 January 1800 – 1800 – Quasi-War (French Revolutionary Wars)
 Battle of Ravine-à-Couleuvres – 1802 – Saint-Domingue expedition (Haitian Revolution)
 Battle of Crête-à-Pierrot – 1802 – Saint-Domingue expedition (Haitian Revolution)
 Action of 28 June 1803 – 1803 – Saint-Domingue expedition (Haitian Revolution)
 Siege of Port-au-Prince (1803) – 1803 – Saint-Domingue expedition (Haitian Revolution)
 Battle of Vertières – 1803 – Saint-Domingue expedition (Haitian Revolution)

Honduras 

 Raid on Puerto Caballos (1594) – 1594 – Anglo-Spanish War (1585–1604)
 Battle of Puerto Caballos (1603) – 1603 – Anglo-Spanish War (1585–1604)
 Battle of San Fernando de Omoa – 1779 – American Revolutionary War
 Action of 12 December 1779 – 1779 – American Revolutionary War
 Battle of Roatán – 1782 – American Revolutionary War
 Battle of the Black River – 1782 – American Revolutionary War
 Battle of La Trinidad – 1827 – First Central American Civil War

Hungary
 Battle of Bolia – 469 – Roman–Germanic wars
 Battle of Mohi – 1241 – First Mongol invasion of Hungary
 Siege of Esztergom (1241) – 1242 – First Mongol invasion of Hungary
 Battle of Isaszeg (1265) – 1265 – Hungarian Civil War (1264–1265)
 Siege of Güns – 1526 – Habsburg–Ottoman wars in Hungary (1526–1568) (Ottoman–Habsburg wars) [Ottoman wars in Europe]
 Battle of Mohács – 1526 – Ottoman–Hungarian wars and Ottoman–Habsburg wars (Ottoman wars in Europe)
 Battle of Sződfalva – 1527 – Hungarian campaign of 1527–1528 (Ottoman–Habsburg wars)
 Battle of Tarcal – 1527 – Hungarian campaign of 1527–1528 (Ottoman–Habsburg wars)
 Siege of Buda (1530) – 1530 – Habsburg–Ottoman wars in Hungary (1526–1568) (Ottoman–Habsburg wars) [Ottoman wars in Europe]
 Siege of Güns – 1532 – Habsburg–Ottoman wars in Hungary (1526–1568) (Ottoman–Habsburg wars) [Ottoman wars in Europe]
 Siege of Buda (1541) – 1541 – Habsburg–Ottoman wars in Hungary (1526–1568) (Ottoman–Habsburg wars) [Ottoman wars in Europe]
 Siege of Pest – 1542 – Habsburg–Ottoman wars in Hungary (1526–1568) (Ottoman–Habsburg wars) [Ottoman wars in Europe]
 Siege of Esztergom (1543) – 1543 – Habsburg–Ottoman wars in Hungary (1526–1568) (Ottoman–Habsburg wars) [Ottoman wars in Europe]
 Siege of Székesfehérvár (1543) – 1543 – Habsburg–Ottoman wars in Hungary (1526–1568) (Ottoman–Habsburg wars) [Ottoman wars in Europe]
 Siege of Eger – 1552 – Ottoman–Hungarian wars and Ottoman–Habsburg wars (Ottoman wars in Europe)
 Siege of Szigetvár – 1566 – Hundred Years' Croatian–Ottoman War (Croatian–Ottoman wars, Ottoman–Hungarian wars and Ottoman–Habsburg wars) [Ottoman wars in Europe]
 Siege of Eger (1596) – 1596 – Long Turkish War (Ottoman–Habsburg wars)
 Battle of Keresztes – 1596 – Long Turkish War (Ottoman–Habsburg wars)
 Siege of Székesfehérvár – 1601 – Long Turkish War (Ottoman–Habsburg wars)
 Battle of Saint Gotthard – 1664 – Austro-Turkish War (1663–1664) (Ottoman–Habsburg wars) [Ottoman wars in Europe]
 Siege of Visegrád – 1684 – Great Turkish War
 Battle of Vác (1684) – 1684 – Great Turkish War
 Siege of Buda (1684) – 1684 – Great Turkish War
 Siege of Buda (1686) – 1686 – Great Turkish War
 Siege of Pécs – 1686 – Great Turkish War
 Battle of Mohács (1687) – 1687 – Great Turkish War
 Battle of Koroncó – 1704 – Rákóczi's War of Independence (War of the Spanish Succession)
 Battle of Saint Gotthard (1705) – 1705 – Rákóczi's War of Independence (War of the Spanish Succession)
 Battle of Raab – 1809 – War of the Fifth Coalition (Napoleonic Wars)
 Battle of Pákozd – 1848
 Battle of Schwechat – 1848
 Battle of Mór – 1848
 Battle of Kápolna – 1849
 Battle of Debrecen – 1944
 Siege of Budapest – 1945
 Operation Spring Awakening – 1945

India
 Battle of the Ten Kings – c. 14th century BC
 Battle of Beas River – 1285 – Mongol invasions of India
 Battle of Kili – 1299 – Mongol invasions of India
 Siege of Delhi (1303) – Mongol invasions of India
 Battle of Amroha – 1305 – Mongol invasions of India
 Battle of Ravi – 1306 – Mongol invasions of India
 First battle of Delhi (1398) – 1398 – Timurid conquests and invasions
 Second battle of Delhi (1398) – 1398 – Timurid conquests and invasions
 Battle of Jammu (1399) – 1399 – Timurid conquests and invasions
 First Battle of Cannanore – 1501 – Portuguese battles in the Indian Ocean
 Battle of Calicut (1503) – 1503 – Portuguese battles in the Indian Ocean
 Battle of Cannanore – 1506 – Portuguese–Mamluk naval war
 Siege of Cannanore (1507) – 1507 – Portuguese–Mamluk naval war
 Battle of Chaul – 1508 – Portuguese–Mamluk naval war
 Battle of Diu (1509) – 1509 – Portuguese–Mamluk naval war
 Portuguese conquest of Goa – 1510 – Portuguese–Mamluk naval war
 First Battle of Panipat – 1526 – Mughal conquests
 Siege of Sambhal – 1526 – Mughal conquests
 Battle of Khanwa – 1527 – Mughal conquests
 Battle of Chanderi or Siege of Chanderi – 1528 – Mughal conquests
 Battle of Ghaghra – 1529 – Mughal conquests
 Siege of Diu (1531) – 1531 – Ottoman–Portuguese confrontations
 Siege of Diu (1538) – 1538 – Ottoman–Portuguese conflicts (1538–1559) (Ottoman–Portuguese confrontations)
 Action at Diu – 1554 – Ottoman–Portuguese conflicts (1538–1559) (Ottoman–Portuguese confrontations)
 Second Battle of Panipat – 1556 – Mughal conquests
 Battle of Talikota – 1565 – Muslim conquests in the Indian subcontinent
 Battle of Tukaroi – 1575 – Mughal invasion of Bengal
 Battle of Swally – 1612 – Portuguese Empire
 Battle of Samdhara – 1616 – Ahom–Mughal conflicts
 Battle of Rohilla – 1621 – Mughal-Sikh War
 Battle of Amritsar (1634) – 1634 – Mughal-Sikh War
 Battle of Lahira – 1634 – Mughal-Sikh War
 Battle of Goa (1638) – 1638 – Dutch–Portuguese War
 Action of 30 September 1639 – 1639 – Dutch–Portuguese War
 Battle of Samugarh – 1658 – Mughal War of Succession 1658–1659
 Battle of Saraighat – 1671 – Ahom–Mughal conflicts
 Battle of Bhangani – 1688 – Mughal-Sikh War
 Siege of Jinji – 1690 – 1698 – Mughal–Maratha Wars
 Battle of Nadaun – 1691 – Mughal-Sikh War
 Battle of Guler (1696) – 1696 – Mughal-Sikh War
 Battle of Anandpur (1700) – 1700 – Mughal-Sikh War
 Battle of Anandpur (1701) – 1701 – Mughal-Sikh War
 Battle of Nirmohgarh (1702) – 1702 – Mughal-Sikh War
 Battle of Basoli – 1702 – Mughal-Sikh War
 First Battle of Chamkaur – 1702 – Mughal-Sikh War
 First Battle of Anandpur (1704) – 1704 – Mughal-Sikh War
 Second Battle of Anandpur (1704) – 1704 – Mughal-Sikh War
 Battle of Sarsa – 1704 – Mughal-Sikh War
 Battle of Chamkaur – 1704 or 1705 – Mughal-Sikh War
 Battle of Muktsar – 1705 – Mughal-Sikh War
 Battle of Jajau – 1707 – Mughal-Sikh War and Mughal war of succession (1707–1709)
 Battle of Sonipat – 1709 – Mughal-Sikh War
 Battle of Samana – 1709 – Mughal-Sikh War
 Battle of Chappar Chiri – 1710 – Mughal-Sikh War
 Siege of Sirhind – 1710 – Mughal-Sikh War
 Battle of Sadhaura – 1710 – Mughal-Sikh War
 Battle of Rahon (1710) – 1710 – Mughal-Sikh War
 Battle of Jalalabad (1710) – 1710 – Mughal-Sikh War
 Battle of Thanesar (1710) – 1710 – Mughal-Sikh War
 Battle of Lohgarh – 1710 – Mughal-Sikh War
 Battle of Jammu (1712) – 1712 – Mughal-Sikh War
 Siege of Gurdaspur – 1715 – Mughal-Sikh War
 Battle of Gurdas Nangal – 1715 – Mughal-Sikh War
 Battle of Palkhed – 1728 – Battles involving the Maratha Empire
 Battle of Karnal – 1739 – Nader Shah's invasion of India (Campaigns of Nader Shah)
 Siege of Trichinopoly (1741) – 1741 – Battles involving the Maratha Empire
 Battle of Colachel – 1741 – Travancore–Dutch War
 Siege of Trichinopoly (1743) – 1743
 Action of 6 July 1746 – 1746 – First Carnatic War (War of the Austrian Succession and Carnatic Wars)
 Battle of Madras – 1746 – First Carnatic War (War of the Austrian Succession and Carnatic Wars)
 Battle of Adyar – 1746 – First Carnatic War (War of the Austrian Succession and Carnatic Wars)
 Battle of Manupur (1748) – 1748 – Indian campaign of Ahmad Shah Durrani (Afghan–Sikh Wars)
 Siege of Cuddalore (1748) – 1748 – First Carnatic War (War of the Austrian Succession and Carnatic Wars)
 Siege of Pondicherry (1748) – 1748 – First Carnatic War (War of the Austrian Succession and Carnatic Wars)
 Battle of Ambur – 1749 – Second Carnatic War
 Siege of Trichinopoly (1751–1752) – 1751 – 1752 – Second Carnatic War
 Siege of Arcot – 1751 – Second Carnatic War
 Battle of Arnee – 1751 – Second Carnatic War
 Battle of Chingleput – 1752 – Second Carnatic War
 Battle of Golden Rock – 1753 – Second Carnatic War
 Battle of Seringham – 1753 – Second Carnatic War
 Battle of Plassey – 1757 – Bengal War and Seven Years' War
 Battle of Amritsar (1757) – 1757 – Indian campaign of Ahmad Shah Durrani (Afghan–Sikh Wars)
 Battle of Mahilpur (1757) – 1757 – Indian campaign of Ahmad Shah Durrani (Afghan–Sikh Wars)
 Battle of Panipat (1761) – 1761 – Afghan-Maratha Wars
 Battle of Kup – 1762 – Indian campaign of Ahmad Shah Durrani (Afghan–Sikh Wars)
 Battle of Harnaulgarh – 1762 – Indian campaign of Ahmad Shah Durrani (Afghan–Sikh Wars)
 Battle of Sirhind (1764) – 1764 – Indian campaign of Ahmad Shah Durrani (Afghan–Sikh Wars)
 Battle of Delhi (1764) – 1764 – 1765 – Mughal-Sikh War
 Battle of Tiruvannamalai – 1767 – First Anglo-Mysore War (Anglo-Mysore Wars)
 Siege of Ambur – 1767 – First Anglo-Mysore War (Anglo-Mysore Wars)
 Battle of Ooscota – 1768 – First Anglo-Mysore War (Anglo-Mysore Wars)
 Siege of Tanjore – 1769
 Siege of Pondicherry (1778) – 1778 – American Revolutionary War
 Battle of Wadgaon – 1779 – First Anglo-Maratha War
 Siege of Tellicherry – 1779 – 1782 – Second Anglo-Mysore War
 Battle of Pollilur (1780) – 1780 – Second Anglo-Mysore War
 Siege of Vellore – 1780 – 1782 – Second Anglo-Mysore War
 Battle of Porto Novo – 1781 – Second Anglo-Mysore War
 Battle of Pollilur (1781) – 1781 – Second Anglo-Mysore War
 Battle of Sholinghur – 1781 – Second Anglo-Mysore War
 Siege of Negapatam – 1781 – Second Anglo-Mysore War and Fourth Anglo-Dutch War (American Revolutionary War)
 Battle of Sadras – 1782 – American Revolutionary War
 Battle of Negapatam (1782) – 1782 – American Revolutionary War
 Battle of Delhi (1783) – 1783 – Mughal-Sikh War
 Siege of Bednore – 1783 – Second Anglo-Mysore War
 Siege of Mangalore – 1783 – 1784 – Second Anglo-Mysore War
 Siege of Cuddalore – 1783 – Second Anglo-Mysore War and Fourth Anglo-Dutch War (American Revolutionary War)
 Battle of Cuddalore (1783) – 1783 – American Revolutionary War
 Battle of Nedumkotta – 1789 – 1790 – Third Anglo-Mysore War
 Battle of Sittimungulum – 1790 – Third Anglo-Mysore War
 Siege of Darwar – 1790 – 1791 – Third Anglo-Mysore War
 Siege of Koppal – 1790 – 1791 – Third Anglo-Mysore War
 Battle of Tirurangadi – 1790 – Third Anglo-Mysore War
 Capture of Cannanore – 1790 – Third Anglo-Mysore War
 Siege of Bangalore – 1791 – Third Anglo-Mysore War
 Battle of Arakere – 1791 – Third Anglo-Mysore War
 Siege of Coimbatore – 1791 – Third Anglo-Mysore War
 Siege of Goorumconda – 1791 – Third Anglo-Mysore War
 Siege of Nundydroog – 1791 – Third Anglo-Mysore War
 Battle of Tellicherry – 1791 – Third Anglo-Mysore War
 Capture of Hooly Honore – 1791 – Third Anglo-Mysore War
 Siege of Savendroog – 1791 – Third Anglo-Mysore War
 Capture of Shimoga – 1791 – 1792 – Third Anglo-Mysore War
 Siege of Seringapatam (1792) – 1792 – Third Anglo-Mysore War
 Siege of Pondicherry (1793) – 1793 – French Revolutionary Wars
 Action of 28 February 1799 – 1799 – French Revolutionary Wars
 Battle of Seedaseer – 1799 – Fourth Anglo-Mysore War
 Battle of Mallavelly – 1799 – Fourth Anglo-Mysore War
 Battle of Sultanpet Tope – 1799 – Fourth Anglo-Mysore War
 Siege of Seringapatam (1799) – 1799 – Fourth Anglo-Mysore War
 Battle of Poona – 1802 – Second Anglo-Maratha War
 Siege of Ahmednagar – 1803 – Second Anglo-Maratha War
 Siege of Aligarh – 1803 – Second Anglo-Maratha War
 Battle of Delhi (1803) – 1803 – Second Anglo-Maratha War
 Battle of Assaye – 1803 – Second Anglo-Maratha War
 Battle of Laswari – 1803 – Second Anglo-Maratha War
 Battle of Argaon – 1803 – Second Anglo-Maratha War
 Capture of Gawilghur – 1803 – Second Anglo-Maratha War
 Battle of Mukandwara Pass – 1804 – Second Anglo-Maratha War
 Siege of Delhi (1804) – 1804 – Second Anglo-Maratha War
 Battle of Deeg – 1804 – Second Anglo-Maratha War
 Battle of Farrukhabad – 1804 – Second Anglo-Maratha War
 Siege of Deeg – 1804 – Second Anglo-Maratha War
 Siege of Bharatpur (1805) – 1805 – Second Anglo-Maratha War
 Battle of Nalapani – 1814 – Anglo-Nepalese War
 Battle of Jaithak – ??? – Anglo-Nepalese War
 Battle of Khadki – 1817 – Third Anglo-Maratha War (Anglo-Maratha Wars)
 Battle of Sitabuldi – 1817 – Third Anglo-Maratha War (Anglo-Maratha Wars)
 Battle of Mahidpur – 1817 – Third Anglo-Maratha War (Anglo-Maratha Wars)
 Battle of Koregaon – 1818 – Third Anglo-Maratha War (Anglo-Maratha Wars)
 Battle of Shopian – 1819 – Afghan–Sikh Wars
 Battle of Asal Uttar – 1965 – Indo-Pakistani War of 1965
 Battle of Longewala – 1971 – Indo-Pakistani War of 1971
 Battle of Tololing – 1999

Indonesia
 Battle of Genter or Battle of Ganter – 1222
 Battle of Bubat – 1357
 Battle of Bantam – 1601 – Dutch–Portuguese War
 Battle of Gegodog – 1676 – Trunajaya rebellion
 Battle of Surabaya (1677) – 1677 – Trunajaya rebellion
 Fall of Plered – 1677 – Trunajaya rebellion
 Assault of Kediri – 1678 – Trunajaya rebellion
 Action of 9 September 1796 – 1796 – French Revolutionary Wars
 Invasion of Java (1811) – 1811 – Napoleonic Wars
 Diponegoro War – 1825
 Padri War – 1821–37
 Aceh War – 1870 to 1910
 Puputan Badung – 1906
 Puputan Klungkung – 1908
 Battle of Java Sea – 27 February 1942 to 1 March 1942
 Battle of Surabaya – October to November 1945
 Battle of Medan Area – 10 December 1945
 Battle of Ambarawa – 20 November 1945
 Bandung Lautan Api (Bandung Sea of Flames) – 24 March 1946
 Major Offensive (Serangan Umum) – 1 March 1949
 Naval Battle of Arafura Sea – 1962

Iran 

 Battle of Diyala River – 693 BC – Campaigns of the Neo-Assyrian Empire
 Battle of Ulai – c. 653 BC – Assyrian conquest of Elam
 Battle of Susa – 647 BC – Assyrian conquest of Elam
 Battle of the Persian Border – c. 551 BC – Wars of Cyrus the Great
 Battle of the Uxian Defile – 331 BC – Wars of Alexander the Great
 Battle of the Persian Gate – 330 BC – Wars of Alexander the Great
 Battle of Paraitakene – 317 BC – Second War of the Diadochi
 Battle of Gabiene – 315 BC – Second War of the Diadochi
 Battle of Ecbatana – 129 BC – Seleucid–Parthian Wars
 Battle of Hormozdgan – 224
 Battle of Avarayr – 451
 Battle of the Blarathon – 591 – Byzantine–Sasanian War of 572–591 (Roman–Persian Wars) and Sasanian civil war of 589–591
 Siege of Shushtar – 641 – 642 – Muslim conquest of Khuzestan (Muslim conquest of Persia)
 Siege of Gundishapur – 642 – Muslim conquest of Khuzestan (Muslim conquest of Persia)
 Battle of Nahavand – 642 – Muslim conquest of Central Persia (Muslim conquest of Persia)
 Battle of Spahan – 642 – Muslim conquest of Central Persia (Muslim conquest of Persia)
 Battle of Waj Rudh – 642 or 643 – Muslim conquest of Central Persia (Muslim conquest of Persia)
 Battle of Bayrudh – 643 or 644 – Muslim conquest of Khuzestan (Muslim conquest of Persia)
 Battle of Bishapur (643–644) – 643 – 644 – Muslim conquest of Pars (Muslim conquest of Persia)
 Battle of Istakhr (650–653) – 650 – 653 – Muslim conquest of Pars (Muslim conquest of Persia)
 Battle of Ray – 651 – Muslim conquest of Central Persia (Muslim conquest of Persia)
 Battle of Nishapur – 652 – Muslim conquest of Khorasan (Muslim conquest of Persia)
 Battle of Damghan (1063) – 1063 – Seljuk Civil War
 Battle of Kerj Abu Dulaf – 1073 – Seljuk Civil War
 Battle of Zava – 1342
 Siege of Isfahan (1387) – 1387 – Timurid conquests and invasions
 Battle of Damghan (1447) – 1447 – Timurid wars of succession
 Battle of Nishapur (1447) – 1447 – Timurid wars of succession
 Battle of Farhadgerd – 1449 – Timurid wars of succession
 Battle of Sarakhs (1459) – 1459 – Timurid wars of succession
 Battle of Chaldiran – 1514 – Ottoman–Persian Wars
 Battle of the Strait of Hormuz (1553) – 1553 – Ottoman campaign against Hormuz (Ottoman–Portuguese conflicts (1538–1559)) [Ottoman–Portuguese confrontations]
 Battle of the Gulf of Oman – 1554 – Ottoman campaign against Hormuz (Ottoman–Portuguese conflicts (1538–1559)) [Ottoman–Portuguese confrontations]
 Ottoman capture of Tabriz (1603) – 1603 – Ottoman–Safavid War (1603–1618) (Ottoman–Persian Wars)
 Battle of Urmia (1604) – 1604 – Ottoman–Safavid War (1603–1618) (Ottoman–Persian Wars)
 Battle of Sufiyan – 1605 – Ottoman–Safavid War (1603–1618) (Ottoman–Persian Wars)
 Battle off Hormuz (1625) – 1625 – Dutch–Portuguese War
 Battle of Gulnabad – 1722 – Fall of the Safavid Empire (Campaigns of Nader Shah)
 Siege of Isfahan – 1722 – Fall of the Safavid Empire (Campaigns of Nader Shah)
 Peter the Great's capture of Rasht – 1722 – 1723 – Russo-Persian War (1722–1723) (Russo-Persian Wars)
 Battle of Sangan – 1727 – Khorasan campaign of Nader Shah (Campaigns of Nader Shah)
 Battle of Damghan (1729) – 1729 – Restoration of Tahmasp II to the Safavid throne (Campaigns of Nader Shah)
 Battle of Khwar Pass – 1729 – Restoration of Tahmasp II to the Safavid throne (Campaigns of Nader Shah)
 Battle of Murche-Khort – 1729 – Restoration of Tahmasp II to the Safavid throne (Campaigns of Nader Shah)
 Liberation of Isfahan – 1729 – Restoration of Tahmasp II to the Safavid throne (Campaigns of Nader Shah)
 Battle of Zarghan – 1730 – Restoration of Tahmasp II to the Safavid throne (Campaigns of Nader Shah)
 Battle of Aslanduz – 1812 – Russo-Persian War (1804–1813)

Iraq
 Battle of Diyala River – 693 BC – Campaigns of the Neo-Assyrian Empire
 Battle of Halule – 691 BC – Campaigns of the Neo-Assyrian Empire
 Siege of Babylon – 689 BC – Campaigns of the Neo-Assyrian Empire 
 Fall of Tarbisu – 615 BC – Medo-Babylonian conquest of the Assyrian Empire
 Fall of Assur – 614 BC – Medo-Babylonian conquest of the Assyrian Empire 
 Battle of Nineveh (612 BC) – Medo-Babylonian conquest of the Assyrian Empire 
 Battle of Opis – 539 BC – Wars of Cyrus the Great 
 Fall of Babylon – 539 BC – Wars of Cyrus the Great 
 Battle of Gaugamela – 331 BC – Wars of Alexander the Great
 First Siege of Babylon (311 BC) – 311 BC – Babylonian War (Wars of the Diadochi)
 Battle of the Tigris – 311 BC – Babylonian War (Wars of the Diadochi)
 Second Siege of Babylon (310 BC) – 310 BC – Babylonian War (Wars of the Diadochi)
 Third Siege of Babylon (309 BC) – 309 BC – Babylonian War (Wars of the Diadochi)
 Battle of the 25 of Abu – 309 BC – Babylonian War (Wars of the Diadochi)
 Battle of Ctesiphon (165) – 165 – Roman–Parthian War of 161–166 (Roman–Parthian Wars)
 Battle of Ctesiphon (198) – 198 – Roman–Persian Wars
 Fall of Hatra – 240 – 241 – Roman–Persian Wars
 Battle of Misiche – 244 – Roman–Persian Wars
 Battle of Ctesiphon (263) – 263 – Roman–Persian Wars
 Battle of Singara (344) – 344 – Perso-Roman wars of 337–361 (Roman–Persian Wars)
 Siege of Pirisabora – 363 – Julian's Persian expedition (Roman–Persian Wars)
 Siege of Maiozamalcha – 363 – Julian's Persian expedition (Roman–Persian Wars)
 Battle of Ctesiphon (363) – 363 – Julian's Persian expedition (Roman–Persian Wars)
 Battle of Maranga – 363 – Julian's Persian expedition (Roman–Persian Wars)
 Battle of Samarra (363) – 363 – Julian's Persian expedition (Roman–Persian Wars)
 Battle of Nineveh (627) – 627 – Byzantine–Sasanian War of 602–628 (Roman–Persian Wars)
 Siege of Ctesiphon (629) – 629 – Sasanian civil war of 628–632
 Battle of River – 633 – Muslim conquest of Mesopotamia
 Battle of Walaja – 633 – Muslim conquest of Mesopotamia
 Battle of Ullais – 633 – Muslim conquest of Mesopotamia
 Battle of Hira – 633 – Muslim conquest of Mesopotamia
 Battle of al-Anbar – 633 – Muslim conquest of Mesopotamia
 Battle of Ayn al-Tamr – 633 – Muslim conquest of Mesopotamia
 Battle of Husayd – 633 – Muslim conquest of Mesopotamia
 Battle of Muzayyah – 633 – Muslim conquest of Mesopotamia
 Battle of Saniyy – 633 – Muslim conquest of Mesopotamia
 Battle of Zumail – 633 – Muslim conquest of Mesopotamia
 Battle of Firaz – 634 – Muslim conquest of Mesopotamia
 Battle of Babylon (634) – 634 – Muslim conquest of Mesopotamia
 Battle of Namaraq – 634 – Muslim conquest of Mesopotamia
 Battle of Kaskar – 634 – Muslim conquest of Mesopotamia
 Battle of the Bridge – 634 – Muslim conquest of Mesopotamia
 Battle of Buwaib – 634 – Muslim conquest of Mesopotamia
 Battle of al-Qadisiyyah – 636 – Muslim conquest of Mesopotamia
 Battle of Burs – 636 – Muslim conquest of Mesopotamia
 Battle of Babylon (636) – 636 – Muslim conquest of Mesopotamia
 Siege of Ctesiphon (637) – 637 – Muslim conquest of Mesopotamia
 Battle of Jalula – 637 – Muslim conquest of Mesopotamia
 Battle of the Camel – 656 – First Fitna
 Battle of Nahrawan – 658 – First Fitna
 Battle of Karbala – 680 – Second Fitna
 Battle of Khazir – 686 – Second Fitna
 Battles of Madhar and Harura – 686 – Second Fitna
 Battle of Maskin – 691 – Second Fitna
 Siege of Baghdad (812–813) – 812 – 813 – Fourth Fitna
 Siege of Baghdad (865) – 865 – Abbasid civil war (865–866)
 Battle of the Barges – 869 – Zanj Rebellion
 Battle of Basra (871) – 871 – Zanj Rebellion
 Battle of Baghdad (946) – 946 – Buyid-Hamdanid Wars
 Siege of Baghdad (1136) – 1136 – Abbasid-Seljuq Wars
 Siege of Baghdad (1157) – 1157 – Abbasid-Seljuq Wars
 Siege of Baghdad (1258) – 1258 – Mongol invasions and conquests
 Capture of Mosul (1517) – 1517 – Ottoman–Persian Wars
 Capture of Baghdad (1534) – 1534 – Ottoman–Safavid War (1532–1555) (Ottoman–Persian Wars)
 Capture of Baghdad (1624) – 1624 – Ottoman–Safavid War (1623–1639) (Ottoman–Persian Wars)
 Capture of Baghdad (1638) – 1638 – Ottoman–Safavid War (1623–1639) (Ottoman–Persian Wars)
 Siege of Baghdad (1733) – 1733 – Nader Shah's Mesopotamian campaign (Ottoman–Persian War (1730–1735))
 Battle of Samarra (1733) – 1733 – Nader Shah's Mesopotamian campaign (Ottoman–Persian War (1730–1735))
 Battle of Kirkuk (1733) – 1733 – Nader Shah's Mesopotamian campaign (Ottoman–Persian War (1730–1735))
 Wahhabi sack of Karbala – 1802
 Battle of Ctesiphon (1915) – 1915 – Mesopotamian campaign (World War I)
 Iran–Iraq War, 1980–88
 Invasion of Kuwait, 1990
 Gulf War, 1990–91
 Iraq War

Ireland

Israel
 Battle of Megiddo (15th century BC) –  1457 BC – Thutmose III's first campaign in the Levant
 Siege of Azekah – 701 BC – Sennacherib's campaign in the Levant
 Siege of Lachish – 701 BC – Sennacherib's campaign in the Levant
 Assyrian siege of Jerusalem – 701 BC – Sennacherib's campaign in the Levant
 Fall of Ashdod – c. 655 BC – Campaigns of the Neo-Assyrian Empire
 Siege of Jerusalem (597 BC) – c. 597 BC – Judah's revolts against Babylon
 Siege of Jerusalem (587 BC) – 589 BC – 587 BC – Judah's revolts against Babylon
 Battle of Panium – 200 BC – Fifth Syrian War 
 Battle of Adasa – 161 BC – Maccabean Revolt
 Battle of Cana – 84 BC 
 Siege of Jerusalem (63 BC) – 63 BC – Third Mithridatic War (Mithridatic Wars) and Hasmonean Civil War
 Siege of Sepphoris (66) – 66 – First Jewish–Roman War
 Sack of Jaffa (66) – 66 – First Jewish–Roman War
 Battle of Geva – 66 – First Jewish–Roman War
 Battle of Beth Horon (66) – 66 – First Jewish–Roman War
 Pillage of Ein Gedi – 67 – First Jewish–Roman War
 Siege of Sepphoris (67) – 67 – First Jewish–Roman War
 Battle of Arrab – 67 – First Jewish–Roman War
 Siege of Yodfat – 67 – First Jewish–Roman War
 Siege of Gamla – 67 – First Jewish–Roman War
 Battle of Mount Tabor (67) – 67 – First Jewish–Roman War
 Siege of Gush Halav – 67 – First Jewish–Roman War
 Zealot Temple Siege – 68 – First Jewish–Roman War
 Siege of Jerusalem (70 CE) – 70 – First Jewish–Roman War
 Siege of Masada – 73 – 74 – First Jewish–Roman War
 Siege of Caesarea Maritima (614) – 614 – Byzantine–Sasanian War of 602–628 (Roman–Persian Wars)
 Sasanian conquest of Jerusalem – 614 – Byzantine–Sasanian War of 602–628 (Roman–Persian Wars)
 Battle of Ajnadayn – 634 – Muslim conquest of the Levant (Arab–Byzantine wars)
 Battle of Fahl – 635 – Muslim conquest of the Levant (Arab–Byzantine wars)
 Siege of Jerusalem (636–637) – 636 – 637 or 638 – Muslim conquest of the Levant (Arab–Byzantine wars)
 Siege of Jerusalem (1099) – 1099 – First Crusade (Crusades)
 Battle of Ascalon – 1099 – First Crusade (Crusades)
 First siege of Arsuf – 1099 – Crusades
 Battle of Ramla (1101) – 1101 – Crusades
 Battle of Ramla (1102) – 1102 – Crusades
 Siege of Acre (1104) – 1104 – Crusades
 Battle of Ramla (1105) – 1105 – Crusades
 Battle of al-Sannabra – 1113 – Crusades
 Battle of Yibneh – 1123 – Crusades
 Siege of Ascalon – 1153 – Crusades
 Battle of Lake Huleh (1157) – 1157 – Crusades
 Battle of Montgisard – 1177 – Crusades
 Siege of Jacob's Ford – 1179 – Crusades
 Battle of Belvoir Castle – 1182 – Crusades
 Battle of al-Fule – 1183 – Crusades
 Battle of Cresson – 1187 – Crusades
 Battle of Hattin – 1187 – Crusades
 Siege of Jerusalem (1187) – 1187 – Crusades
 Siege of Safed (1188) – 1188 – Crusades
 Siege of Acre (1189–1191) – 1189 – 1191 – Third Crusade (Crusades)
 Battle of Arsuf – 1191 – Third Crusade (Crusades)
 Battle of Jaffa (1192) – 1192 – Third Crusade (Crusades)
 Battle of Acre (1258) – 1258 – War of Saint Sabas
 Battle of Ain Jalut – 1260 – Mongol invasions of the Levant
 Fall of Arsuf – 1265 – Crusades
 Fall of Caesarea – 1265 – Crusades
 Fall of Haifa (1265) – 1265 – Crusades
 Siege of Safed (1266) – 1266 – Crusades
 Siege of Acre (1291) – 1291 – Crusades
 Siege of Jaffa – 1799 – French campaign in Egypt and Syria (War of the Second Coalition) [French Revolutionary Wars]
 Siege of Acre (1799) – 1799 – French campaign in Egypt and Syria (War of the Second Coalition) [French Revolutionary Wars]
 Battle of Mount Tabor (1799) – 1799 – French campaign in Egypt and Syria (War of the Second Coalition) [French Revolutionary Wars]
 Siege of Jerusalem (1834) – 1834 – Peasants' revolt in Palestine
 1834 looting of Safed – 1834 – Peasants' revolt in Palestine
 Battle of Acre (1840) – 1840 – Egyptian–Ottoman War (1839–1841)

Italy
 Battle of Cumae – 524 BC
 Battle of Lake Regillus – c. 496 BC – Latin War (498–493 BC) (Roman–Latin wars)
 Battle of Himera (480 BC) – 480 BC – Sicilian Wars
 Battle of the Cremera – 477 BC – Roman–Etruscan Wars
 Battle of Cumae – 474 BC
 Battle of Mount Algidus – 458 BC – Roman–Italic wars
 Battle of the Himera River (446 BC) – 446 BC
 Battle of Corbio – 446 BC – Rome's early Italian campaigns
 Capture of Fidenae (435 BC) – 435 BC – Rome's early Italian campaigns
 Battle of Selinus – 409 BC – Sicilian Wars
 Battle of Himera (409 BC) – 409 BC – Sicilian Wars
 Siege of Akragas (406 BC) – 406 BC – Sicilian Wars
 Battle of Gela (405 BC) – 405 BC – Sicilian Wars
 Sack of Camarina – 405 BC – Sicilian Wars
 Siege of Motya – 398 BC – Sicilian Wars
 Siege of Segesta (397 BC) – 398 BC or 397 BC – Sicilian Wars
 Battle of Messene – 397 BC – Sicilian Wars
 Battle of Catana (397 BC) – 397 BC – Sicilian Wars
 Siege of Syracuse (397 BC) – 397 BC – Sicilian Wars
 Battle of Veii – c. 396 BC – Roman–Etruscan Wars
 Siege of Tauromenium (394 BC) – 394 BC – Sicilian Wars
 Battle of Abacaenum – 393 BC – Sicilian Wars
 Battle of Chrysas – 392 BC – Sicilian Wars
 Battle of the Allia – 387 BC – Roman–Gallic wars
 Battle of Cabala – between 378 BC to 375 BC – Sicilian Wars
 Battle of Cronium – c. 376 BC – Sicilian Wars
 Battle of the Anio River (361 BC) – 361 BC – Roman–Gallic wars
 Battle of Pedum (358 BC) – Roman–Gallic wars
 Siege of Syracuse (343 BC) – 344 BC – 343 BC or 342 BC – Sicilian Wars
 Battle of Vesuvius – 340 BC – Latin War
 Battle of Trifanum – 340 BC – Latin War
 Battle of Mount Gaurus – 339 BC – First Samnite War
 Battle of Saticula – 339 BC – First Samnite War
 Battle of Suessula – 339 BC – First Samnite War
 Battle of the Crimissus – 339 BC – Sicilian Wars
 Battle of Pedum (338 BC) – 338 BC – Latin War
 Capture of Neapolis – 327 BC – Second Samnite war
 Battle of Imbrinium – 325 BC – Second Samnite war
 Battle of the Caudine Forks – 321 BC – Second Samnite war
 Battle of Lautulae – 315 BC – Second Samnite war
 Battle of the Himera River (311 BC) – 311 BC – Sicilian Wars
 Siege of Syracuse (311–309 BC) – 311 BC – 309 BC – Sicilian Wars
 Battle of Lake Vadimo (310 BC) – 310 BC – Second Samnite war
 Battle of Bovianum – 305 BC – Second Samnite war
 Battle of Tifernum – 297 BC – Third Samnite War
 Battle of Camerinum – 295 BC – Third Samnite War
 Battle of Sentinum – 295 BC – Third Samnite War
 Battle of Aquilonia – 293 BC – Third Samnite War
 Battle of Arretium – 284 BC – Roman–Gallic wars
 Battle of Lake Vadimo (283 BC) – 283 BC – Roman–Gallic wars
 Battle of Heraclea – 280 BC – Pyrrhic War
 Battle of Asculum – 279 BC – Pyrrhic War
 Siege of Syracuse (278 BC) – 278 BC – Sicilian Wars and Pyrrhic War
 Siege of Lilybaeum (278 BC) – 278 BC – Sicilian Wars and Pyrrhic War
 Battle of the Cranita hills – 277 BC – Pyrrhic War
 Battle of the Strait of Messina – 276 BC – Sicilian Wars and Pyrrhic War
 Battle of Beneventum (275 BC) – 275 BC – Pyrrhic War
 Battle of Messana – 264 BC – First Punic War (Punic Wars)
 Battle of Agrigentum – 262 BC – First Punic War (Punic Wars)
 Battle of the Lipari Islands – 260 BC – First Punic War (Punic Wars)
 Battle of Mylae – 260 BC – First Punic War (Punic Wars)
 Battle of Thermae – 259 BC – First Punic War (Punic Wars)
 Battle of Sulci – 258 BC – First Punic War (Punic Wars)
 Battle of Tyndaris – 257 BC – First Punic War (Punic Wars)
 Battle of Cape Ecnomus – 256 BC – First Punic War (Punic Wars)
 Battle of Panormus – 250 BC – First Punic War (Punic Wars)
 Siege of Lilybaeum (250–241 BC) – 250 BC – 241 BC – First Punic War (Punic Wars)
 Battle of Drepana – 249 BC – First Punic War (Punic Wars)
 Battle of Phintias – 249 BC – First Punic War (Punic Wars)
 Siege of Drepana – 249 BC – 241 BC – First Punic War (Punic Wars)
 Battle of the Aegates – 241 BC – First Punic War (Punic Wars)
 Battle of Faesulae (225 BC) – 225 BC – Roman–Gallic wars
 Battle of Telamon – 225 BC – Roman–Gallic wars
 Battle of Clastidium – 222 BC – Roman–Gallic wars
 Battle of Lilybaeum – 218 BC – Second Punic War (Punic Wars)
 Battle of Ticinus – 218 BC – Second Punic War (Punic Wars)
 Battle of the Trebia – 218 BC – Second Punic War (Punic Wars)
 Battle of Lake Trasimene – 217 BC – Second Punic War (Punic Wars)
 Battle of Ager Falernus – 217 BC – Second Punic War (Punic Wars)
 Battle of Geronium – 217 BC – Second Punic War (Punic Wars)
 Battle of Cannae – 216 BC – Second Punic War (Punic Wars)
 Battle of Silva Litana – 216 BC – Second Punic War (Punic Wars) and Roman–Gallic wars
 Battle of Nola (216 BC) – 216 BC – Second Punic War (Punic Wars)
 Battle of Nola (215 BC) – 215 BC – Second Punic War (Punic Wars)
 Battle of Decimomannu – 215 BC – Second Punic War (Punic Wars)
 Battle of Beneventum (214 BC) – 214 BC – Second Punic War (Punic Wars)
 Battle of Nola (214 BC) – 214 BC – Second Punic War (Punic Wars)
 Siege of Syracuse (213–212 BC) – 213 BC – 212 BC – Second Punic War (Punic Wars)
 Battle of Tarentum (212 BC) – 212 BC – Second Punic War (Punic Wars)
 Battle of Beneventum (212 BC) – 212 BC – Second Punic War (Punic Wars)
 Battle of Capua – 212 BC – Second Punic War (Punic Wars)
 Battle of the Silarus – 212 BC – Second Punic War (Punic Wars)
 Battle of Herdonia (212 BC) – 212 BC – Second Punic War (Punic Wars)
 Siege of Capua (211 BC) – 211 BC – Second Punic War (Punic Wars)
 Battle of Herdonia (210 BC) – 210 BC – Second Punic War (Punic Wars)
 Battle of Numistro – 210 BC – Second Punic War (Punic Wars)
 Battle of Canusium – 209 BC – Second Punic War (Punic Wars)
 Battle of Tarentum (209 BC) – 209 BC – Second Punic War (Punic Wars)
 Battle of Petelia – 208 BC – Second Punic War (Punic Wars)
 Battle of Grumentum – 207 BC – Second Punic War (Punic Wars)
 Battle of the Metaurus – 207 BC – Second Punic War (Punic Wars)
 Battle of Crotona – 204 BC – Second Punic War (Punic Wars)
 Battle of Insubria – 203 BC – Second Punic War (Punic Wars)
 Battle of Cremona (200 BC) – 200 BC – Roman–Gallic wars
 Battle of Placentia (194 BC) – 194 BC – Roman–Gallic wars
 Battle of Mutina (193 BC) – 193 BC – Roman–Gallic wars
 Battle of Tridentum – 102 BC – Cimbrian War (Roman–Germanic wars)
 Battle of Vercellae – 101 BC – Cimbrian War (Roman–Germanic wars)
 Battle of Acerrae – 90 BC – Social War (91–87 BC)
 Battle of Aesernia – 90 BC – Social War (91–87 BC)
 Battle of Taenum – 90 BC – Social War (91–87 BC)
 Battle of Mount Falernus – 90 BC – Social War (91–87 BC)
 Battle of Firmum – 90 BC – Social War (91–87 BC)
 Battle of Asculum (89 BC) – 89 BC – Social War (91–87 BC)
 Battle of Canusium (89 BC) – 89 BC – Social War (91–87 BC)
 Battle of Fucine Lake – 89 BC – Social War (91–87 BC)
 Battle of Nola (89 BC) – 89 BC – Social War (91–87 BC)
 Battle of Mount Tifata – 83 BC – Sulla's civil war
 Battle of the Asio River (82 BC) – 82 BC – Sulla's civil war
 Battle of Sacriportus – 82 BC – Sulla's civil war
 Battle of Sena Gallica (82 BC) – 82 BC – Sulla's civil war
 First Battle of Clusium (82 BC) – 82 BC – Sulla's civil war
 Battle of Faventia (82 BC) – 82 BC – Sulla's civil war
 Battle of Fidentia (82 BC) – 82 BC – Sulla's civil war
 Second Battle of Clusium – 82 BC – Sulla's civil war
 Battle of the Colline Gate – 82 BC – Sulla's civil war
 Battle of Mount Vesuvius – 73 BC – Third Servile War (Servile Wars)
 Battle of Lentula – 72 BC – Third Servile War (Servile Wars)
 Battle of Gargano – 72 BC – Third Servile War (Servile Wars)
 Battle of Picenum – 72 BC – Third Servile War (Servile Wars)
 Battle of Mutina (72 BC) – 72 BC – Third Servile War (Servile Wars)
 Battle of Cantenna – 71 BC – Third Servile War (Servile Wars)
 First Battle of Campania – 71 BC – Third Servile War (Servile Wars)
 Second Battle of Campania – 71 BC – Third Servile War (Servile Wars)
 Battle of the Silarius River – 71 BC – Third Servile War (Servile Wars)
 Siege of Corfinium – 49 BC – Caesar's civil war
 Siege of Brundisium – 49 BC – Caesar's civil war
 Battle of Mutina – 43 BC – War of Mutina
 Battle of Locus Castorum – c. 69 – Year of the Four Emperors
 First Battle of Bedriacum – 69 – Year of the Four Emperors
 Second Battle of Bedriacum – 69 – Year of the Four Emperors
 Siege of Aquileia – 238 – Year of the Six Emperors (Crisis of the Third Century)
 Battle of Verona (249) – 249 – Crisis of the Third Century
 Battle of Interamna Nahars – 253 – Crisis of the Third Century
 Battle of the Sanguinarian Bridge – 253 – Crisis of the Third Century
 Battle of Mediolanum – 259 – Roman–Germanic wars
 Battle of Lake Benacus – 268 or 269 – Roman–Germanic wars and Crisis of the Third Century
 Battle of Placentia (271) – 271 – Roman–Germanic wars
 Battle of Fano – 271 – Roman–Germanic wars
 Battle of Pavia (271) – 271 – Roman–Germanic wars
 Siege of Segusio – 312 – Civil wars of the Tetrarchy
 Battle of Turin (312) – 312 – Civil wars of the Tetrarchy
 Battle of Brescia (312) – 312 – Civil wars of the Tetrarchy
 Battle of Verona (312) – 312 – Civil wars of the Tetrarchy
 Battle of the Milvian Bridge – 312 – Civil wars of the Tetrarchy
 Siege of Asti (402) – 402 – Gothic War (401–403) (Roman–Germanic wars)
 Battle of Pollentia – 402 – Gothic War (401–403) (Roman–Germanic wars)
 Battle of Verona (402) – 402 – Gothic War (401–403) (Roman–Germanic wars)
 Siege of Florence (405) – 405 – Roman–Germanic wars and Fall of the Western Roman Empire
 Battle of Faesulae (406) – 406 – Roman–Germanic wars and Fall of the Western Roman Empire
 Battle of Ostia (409) – 409 – Fall of the Western Roman Empire
 Sack of Rome (410) – 410 – Fall of the Western Roman Empire and Roman–Germanic wars
 Battle of Rimini (432) – 432 – Fall of the Western Roman Empire
 Sack of Aquileia – 452 – Fall of the Western Roman Empire and Roman–Germanic wars
 Sack of Rome (455) – 455 – Fall of the Western Roman Empire and Roman–Germanic wars
 Battle of Agrigentum (456) – 456 – Fall of the Western Roman Empire and Roman–Germanic wars
 Battle of Garigliano – 457 – Fall of the Western Roman Empire
 Battle of Campi Cannini – 457 – Fall of the Western Roman Empire
 Battle of Bergamo – 464 – Fall of the Western Roman Empire
 Siege of Rome (472) – 472 – Fall of the Western Roman Empire
 Battle of Ravenna (475) – 475 – Fall of the Western Roman Empire
 Battle of Pavia (476) – 476 – Fall of the Western Roman Empire
 Battle of Ravenna (476) – 476 – Roman–Germanic wars and Fall of the Western Roman Empire
 Battle of Isonzo (489) – 489 – Roman–Germanic wars
 Battle of Verona (489) – 489 – Roman–Germanic wars
 Battle of the Adda River – 490 – Roman–Germanic wars
 Siege of Panormus – 535 – Gothic War (535–554) (Roman–Germanic wars)
 Siege of Naples (536) – 536 – Gothic War (535–554) (Roman–Germanic wars)
 Siege of Rome (537–538) – 537 – 538 – Gothic War (535–554) (Roman–Germanic wars)
 Siege of Ariminum (538) – 538 – Gothic War (535–554) (Roman–Germanic wars)
 Siege of Urbinus – 538 – Gothic War (535–554) (Roman–Germanic wars)
 Siege of Urviventus – c. 538 or 539 – Gothic War (535–554) (Roman–Germanic wars)
 Siege of Auximus – 539 – Gothic War (535–554) (Roman–Germanic wars)
 Siege of Ravenna (539–540) – 539 – 540 – Gothic War (535–554) (Roman–Germanic wars)
 Battle of Treviso – 541 – Gothic War (535–554) (Roman–Germanic wars)
 Siege of Verona – 541 – Gothic War (535–554) (Roman–Germanic wars)
 Battle of Faventia – 542 – Gothic War (535–554) (Roman–Germanic wars)
 Battle of Mucellium – 542 – Gothic War (535–554) (Roman–Germanic wars)
 Siege of Naples (542–543) – 542 – 543 – Gothic War (535–554) (Roman–Germanic wars)
 Sack of Rome (546) – 546 – Gothic War (535–554) (Roman–Germanic wars)
 Siege of Rome (549–550) – 549 – 550 – Gothic War (535–554) (Roman–Germanic wars)
 Battle of Sena Gallica (551) – 551 – Gothic War (535–554) (Roman–Germanic wars)
 Battle of Taginae – 552 – Gothic War (535–554) (Roman–Germanic wars)
 Battle of Mons Lactarius – 552 or 553 – Gothic War (535–554) (Roman–Germanic wars)
 Battle of the Volturnus – 554 – Gothic War (535–554) (Roman–Germanic wars)
 Siege of Syracuse (827–828) – 827 – 828 – Muslim conquest of Sicily (Arab–Byzantine wars)
 Siege of Syracuse (868) – 868 – Muslim conquest of Sicily (Arab–Byzantine wars)
 Siege of Syracuse (877–878) – 877 – 878 – Muslim conquest of Sicily (Arab–Byzantine wars)
 Battle of Stelai – 880 – Muslim conquest of Sicily (Arab–Byzantine wars)
 Battle of Caltavuturo – 881 or 882 – Muslim conquest of Sicily (Arab–Byzantine wars)
 Battle of Milazzo (888) – 888 – Muslim conquest of Sicily (Arab–Byzantine wars)
 Battle of Brenta – 899 – Hungarian invasions of Europe
 Siege of Taormina (902) – 902 – Muslim conquest of Sicily (Arab–Byzantine wars)
 Battle of Garigliano – 915 – Arab–Byzantine wars
 Siege of Taormina (962) – 962 – Muslim conquest of Sicily (Arab–Byzantine wars)
 Siege of Rometta – 963 – 965 – Muslim conquest of Sicily (Arab–Byzantine wars)
 Battle of the Straits – 965 – Arab–Byzantine wars
 Battle of Cannae (1018) – 1018 – Norman conquest of southern Italy (Byzantine–Norman wars)
 Battle of Olivento – 1041 – Norman conquest of southern Italy (Byzantine–Norman wars)
 Battle of Montemaggiore – 1041 – Norman conquest of southern Italy (Byzantine–Norman wars)
 Battle of Montepeloso – 1041 – Norman conquest of southern Italy (Byzantine–Norman wars)
 Battle of Civitate – 1053 – Norman conquest of southern Italy (Byzantine–Norman wars)
 Battle of Cerami – 1063 – Norman conquest of southern Italy (Byzantine–Norman wars)
 Battle of Misilmeri – 1068 – Norman conquest of southern Italy (Byzantine–Norman wars)
 Siege of Bari – 1068 – 1071 – Norman conquest of southern Italy (Byzantine–Norman wars)
 Siege of Taormina (1078) – 1078 – Norman conquest of southern Italy (Byzantine–Norman wars)
 Sack of Rome (1084) – 1084 – Norman conquest of southern Italy (Byzantine–Norman wars)
 Siege of Capua – 1098 – Norman conquest of southern Italy (Byzantine–Norman wars)
 Siege of Tortona – 1155 – Guelphs and Ghibellines
 Battle of Brindisi (1156) – 1156 – Byzantine–Norman wars
 Siege of Crema – 1159 – 1160 – Guelphs and Ghibellines
 Battle of Monte Porzio – 1167 – Guelphs and Ghibellines
 Battle of Legnano – 1176 – Guelphs and Ghibellines
 Battle of Calcinato (1201) – 1201 – Guelphs and Ghibellines
 Battle of Cortenuova – 1237 – Guelphs and Ghibellines
 Siege of Brescia – 1238 – Guelphs and Ghibellines
 Siege of Faenza – 1240 – 1241 – Guelphs and Ghibellines
 Battle of Giglio (1241) – 1241 – Guelphs and Ghibellines
 Siege of Viterbo – 1243 – Guelphs and Ghibellines
 Battle of Parma – 1248 – Guelphs and Ghibellines
 Battle of Fossalta – 1249 – Guelphs and Ghibellines
 Battle of Cingoli – 1250 – Guelphs and Ghibellines
 Battle of Cassano (1259) – 1259 – Guelphs and Ghibellines
 Battle of Montaperti – 1260 – Guelphs and Ghibellines
 Battle of Benevento – 1266 – Guelphs and Ghibellines
 Battle of Trapani – 1266 – War of Saint Sabas
 Battle of Tagliacozzo – 1268 – Guelphs and Ghibellines
 Battle of Colle Val d'Elsa – 1269 – Guelphs and Ghibellines
 Battle of Roccavione – 1275 – Guelphs and Ghibellines
 Battle of Desio – 1277 – Guelphs and Ghibellines
 Battle of Forlì – 1282 – Guelphs and Ghibellines
 Battle of the Gulf of Naples – 1284 – War of the Sicilian Vespers
 Battle of the Counts – 1287 – War of the Sicilian Vespers
 Battle of Pieve al Toppo – 1288 – Guelphs and Ghibellines
 Battle of Campaldino – 1289 – Guelphs and Ghibellines
 Battle of Cape Orlando – 1299 – War of the Sicilian Vespers
 Battle of Falconaria – 1299 – War of the Sicilian Vespers
 Battle of Ponza (1300) – 1300 – War of the Sicilian Vespers
 Siege of Mirandola (1321) – 1321
 Battle of Zappolino – 1325 – War of the Bucket (Guelphs and Ghibellines)
 Battle of Gamenario – 1345 – Guelphs and Ghibellines
 Siege of Mirandola (1355) – 1355
 Battle of Cape d'Anzio – 1378 – War of Chioggia (Venetian–Genoese wars)
 Battle of Lido and Brondolo – 1379 – War of Chioggia (Venetian–Genoese wars)
 Battle of Chioggia – 1380 – War of Chioggia (Venetian–Genoese wars)
 Battle of Zagonara – 1424 – Wars in Lombardy
 Battle of Maclodio – 1427 – Wars in Lombardy
 Battle of Soncino – 1431 – Wars in Lombardy
 Battle on the Po (1431) – 1431 – Wars in Lombardy
 Battle of San Romano – 1432 – Wars in Lombardy
 Battle of Delebio – 1432 – Wars in Lombardy
 Battle of Anghiari – 1440 – Wars in Lombardy
 Battle of Bosco Marengo – 1447 – Milanese War of Succession (Wars in Lombardy)
 Battle of Caravaggio – 1448 – Milanese War of Succession (Wars in Lombardy)
 Battle of Ghedi – 1453 – Milanese War of Succession (Wars in Lombardy)
 Battle of Otranto – 1480 – 1481 – Ottoman–Hungarian wars (Ottoman wars in Europe)
 Battle of Rapallo – 1494 – Italian War of 1494–1495 (Italian Wars)
 Battle of Rapallo (1495) – 1495 – Italian War of 1494–1495 (Italian Wars)
 Siege of Novara (1495) – 1495 – Italian War of 1494–1495 (Italian Wars)
 Battle of Seminara – 1495 – Italian War of 1494–1495 (Italian Wars)
 Battle of Fornovo – 1495 – Italian War of 1494–1495 (Italian Wars)
 Battle of Novara (1500) – 1500 – Italian Wars of 1499–1504 (Italian Wars)
 Battle of Ruvo – 1503 – Italian Wars of 1499–1504 (Italian Wars)
 Battle of Seminara (1503) – 1503 – Italian Wars of 1499–1504 (Italian Wars)
 Battle of Cerignola – 1503 – Italian Wars of 1499–1504 (Italian Wars)
 Battle of Garigliano (1503) – 1503 – Italian Wars of 1499–1504 (Italian Wars)
 Battle of Cadore – 1508 – War of the League of Cambrai (Italian Wars)
 Battle of Agnadello – 1509 – War of the League of Cambrai (Italian Wars)
 Siege of Padua – 1509 – War of the League of Cambrai (Italian Wars)
 Battle of Polesella – 1509 – War of the League of Cambrai (Italian Wars)
 Siege of Mirandola (1511) – 1511 – War of the League of Cambrai (Italian Wars)
 Battle of Ravenna (1512) – 1512 – War of the League of Cambrai (Italian Wars) 
 Battle of Novara (1513) – 1513 – War of the League of Cambrai (Italian Wars) 
 Battle of La Motta (1513) or Battle of Schio or Battle of Vicenza or Battle of Creazzo – 1513 – War of the League of Cambrai (Italian Wars) 
 Battle of Marignano – 1515 – War of the League of Cambrai (Italian Wars) 
 Battle of Bicocca – 1522 – Italian War of 1521–1526 (Italian Wars) 
 Siege of Genoa (1522) – 1522 – Italian War of 1521–1526 (Italian Wars) 
 Battle of the Sesia (1524) – 1524 – Italian War of 1521–1526 (Italian Wars) 
 Battle of Pavia – 1525 – Italian War of 1521–1526 (Italian Wars) 
 Sack of Rome (1527) – 1527 – War of the League of Cognac (Italian Wars) 
 Siege of Naples (1528) – 1528 – War of the League of Cognac (Italian Wars) 
 Battle of Capo d'Orso – 1528 – War of the League of Cognac (Italian Wars) 
 Battle of Landriano – 1529 – War of the League of Cognac (Italian Wars) 
 Siege of Florence (1529–1530) – 1529 – 1530 – War of the League of Cognac (Italian Wars) 
 Battle of Gavinana – 1530 – War of the League of Cognac (Italian Wars) 
 Battle of Ceresole – 1544 – Italian War of 1542–1546 (Italian Wars) 
 Battle of Serravalle (1544) – 1544 – Italian War of 1542–1546 (Italian Wars) 
 Siege of Mirandola (1551) – 1551 – 1552 – Italian War of 1551–1559 (Italian Wars) 
 Battle of Ponza (1552) – 1552 – Italian War of 1551–1559 (Italian Wars) and Ottoman–Habsburg wars (Ottoman wars in Europe) 
 Battle of Marciano or Battle of Scannagallo – 1554 – Italian War of 1551–1559 (Italian Wars) 
 Battle of Pantelleria (1586) – 1586 – Anglo-Spanish War (1585–1604) 
 Relief of Genoa – 1625 – Thirty Years' War 
 Battle of Villabuona – 1630 – War of the Mantuan Succession (Thirty Years' War) 
 Battle of Veillane – 1630 – War of the Mantuan Succession (Thirty Years' War) 
 Battle of Tornavento – 1636 – Franco-Spanish War (1635–1659) (Thirty Years' War) 
 Siege of Turin (1640) – 1640 – Piedmontese Civil War (Franco-Spanish War (1635–1659)) [Thirty Years' War] 
 Battle of Orbetello – 1646 – Franco-Spanish War (1635–1659) (Thirty Years' War) 
 Battle of Elba – 1652 – First Anglo-Dutch War (Anglo-Dutch Wars) 
 Battle of Leghorn – 1653 – First Anglo-Dutch War (Anglo-Dutch Wars) 
 Battle of Stromboli – 1676 – Franco-Dutch War 
 Battle of Augusta – 1676 – Franco-Dutch War 
 Battle of Palermo – 1676 – Franco-Dutch War 
 Bombardment of Genoa – 1684 – War of the Reunions 
 Battle of Staffarda – 1690 – Nine Years' War 
 Siege of Cuneo (1691) – 1691 – Nine Years' War 
 Battle of Marsaglia – 1693 – Nine Years' War 
 Battle of Carpi – 1701 – War of the Spanish Succession 
 Battle of Chiari – 1701 – War of the Spanish Succession 
 Battle of Cremona – 1702 – War of the Spanish Succession 
 Battle of Santa Vittoria – 1702 – War of the Spanish Succession 
 Battle of Luzzara – 1702 – War of the Spanish Succession 
 Battle of Cassano (1705) – 1705 – War of the Spanish Succession 
 Battle of Calcinato – 1706 – War of the Spanish Succession 
 Siege of Turin – 1706 – War of the Spanish Succession 
 Battle of Castiglione (1706) – 1706 – War of the Spanish Succession 
 Siege of Gaeta (1707) – 1707 – War of the Spanish Succession 
 Battle of Syracuse (1710) – 1710 – War of the Spanish Succession 
 Battle of Cape Passaro – 1718 – War of the Quadruple Alliance 
 Battle of Milazzo (1718) – 1718 – War of the Quadruple Alliance 
 Battle of Francavilla – 1719 – War of the Quadruple Alliance 
 Siege of Pizzighettone – 1733 – War of the Polish Succession 
 Siege of Gaeta (1734) – 1734 – War of the Polish Succession 
 Siege of Capua (1734) – 1734 – War of the Polish Succession 
 Battle of Bitonto – 1734 – War of the Polish Succession 
 Battle of Colorno – 1734 – War of the Polish Succession 
 Battle of San Pietro – 1734 – War of the Polish Succession 
 Battle of Guastalla – 1734 – War of the Polish Succession 
 Raid on Genoa – 1793 – War of the First Coalition (French Revolutionary Wars) 
 Action of 22 October 1793 – 1793 – War of the First Coalition (French Revolutionary Wars) 
 First Battle of Dego – 1794 – War of the First Coalition (French Revolutionary Wars) 
 Battle of Genoa (1795) – 1795 – War of the First Coalition (French Revolutionary Wars) 
 Battle of Loano – 1795 – War of the First Coalition (French Revolutionary Wars)
 Battle of Voltri – 1796 – Montenotte campaign (War of the First Coalition) [French Revolutionary Wars]
 Battle of Montenotte – 1796 – Montenotte campaign (War of the First Coalition) [French Revolutionary Wars]
 Battle of Millesimo – 1796 – Montenotte campaign (War of the First Coalition) [French Revolutionary Wars]
 Second Battle of Dego – 1796 – Montenotte campaign (War of the First Coalition) [French Revolutionary Wars]
 Battle of Ceva – 1796 – Montenotte campaign (War of the First Coalition) [French Revolutionary Wars]
 Battle of Mondovì – 1796 – Montenotte campaign (War of the First Coalition) [French Revolutionary Wars]
 Battle of Fombio – 1796 – War of the First Coalition (French Revolutionary Wars)
 Battle of Lodi – 1796 – War of the First Coalition (French Revolutionary Wars)
 Battle of Borghetto – 1796 – War of the First Coalition (French Revolutionary Wars)
 Siege of Mantua (1796–1797) – 1796 – 1797 – War of the First Coalition (French Revolutionary Wars)
 Battle of Lonato – 1796 – War of the First Coalition (French Revolutionary Wars)
 Battle of Castiglione – 1796 – War of the First Coalition (French Revolutionary Wars)
 Battle of Peschiera – 1796 – War of the First Coalition (French Revolutionary Wars)
 Battle of Rovereto – 1796 – War of the First Coalition (French Revolutionary Wars)
 Battle of Bassano – 1796 – War of the First Coalition (French Revolutionary Wars)
 Second Battle of Bassano – 1796 – War of the First Coalition (French Revolutionary Wars)
 Battle of Calliano – 1796 – War of the First Coalition (French Revolutionary Wars)
 Battle of Caldiero (1796) – 1796 – War of the First Coalition (French Revolutionary Wars)
 Battle of Arcole – 1796 – War of the First Coalition (French Revolutionary Wars)
 Battle of Rivoli – 1797 – War of the First Coalition (French Revolutionary Wars)
 Battle of Faenza – 1797 – War of the First Coalition (French Revolutionary Wars)
 Battle of Valvasone (1797) – 1797 – War of the First Coalition (French Revolutionary Wars)
 Battle of Tarvis (1797) – 1797 – War of the First Coalition (French Revolutionary Wars)
 Battle of Verona (1799) – 1799 – War of the Second Coalition (French Revolutionary Wars)
 Siege of Mantua (1799) – 1799 – War of the Second Coalition (French Revolutionary Wars)
 Battle of Magnano – 1799 – War of the Second Coalition (French Revolutionary Wars)
 Battle of Cassano (1799) – 1799 – War of the Second Coalition (French Revolutionary Wars)
 Battle of Bassignana (1799) – 1799 – War of the Second Coalition (French Revolutionary Wars)
 First Battle of Marengo (1799) – 1799 – War of the Second Coalition (French Revolutionary Wars)
 Battle of Modena (1799) – 1799 – War of the Second Coalition (French Revolutionary Wars)
 Battle of Trebbia (1799) – 1799 – War of the Second Coalition (French Revolutionary Wars)
 Second Battle of Marengo (1799) – 1799 – War of the Second Coalition (French Revolutionary Wars)
 Battle of Novi (1799) – 1799 – War of the Second Coalition (French Revolutionary Wars)
 Second Battle of Novi (1799) – 1799 – War of the Second Coalition (French Revolutionary Wars)
 Battle of Genola – 1799 – War of the Second Coalition (French Revolutionary Wars)
 Siege of Genoa (1800) – 1800 – War of the Second Coalition (French Revolutionary Wars)
 Siege of Fort Bard – 1800 – War of the Second Coalition (French Revolutionary Wars)
 Battle of Montebello (1800) – 1800 – War of the Second Coalition (French Revolutionary Wars)
 Battle of Marengo – 1800 – War of the Second Coalition (French Revolutionary Wars)
 Battle of Pozzolo – 1800 – War of the Second Coalition (French Revolutionary Wars)
 Siege of Porto Ferrajo – 1801 – War of the Second Coalition (French Revolutionary Wars)
 Battle of Verona (1805) – 1805 – War of the Third Coalition (Napoleonic Wars)
 Battle of Caldiero (1805) – 1805 – War of the Third Coalition (Napoleonic Wars)
 Battle of Castelfranco Veneto – 1805 – War of the Third Coalition (Napoleonic Wars)
 Siege of Gaeta (1806) – 1806 – Invasion of Naples (1806) (War of the Third Coalition) [Napoleonic Wars]
 Battle of Campo Tenese – 1806 – Invasion of Naples (1806) (War of the Third Coalition) [Napoleonic Wars]
 Battle of Maida – 1806 – Invasion of Naples (1806) (War of the Third Coalition) [Napoleonic Wars]
 Battle of Mileto – 1807 – Invasion of Naples (1806) (War of the Third Coalition) [Napoleonic Wars]
 Battle of Sacile – 1809 – War of the Fifth Coalition (Napoleonic Wars)
 Battle of Caldiero (1809) – 1809 – War of the Fifth Coalition (Napoleonic Wars)
 Battle of Piave River (1809) – 1809 – War of the Fifth Coalition (Napoleonic Wars)
 Battle of Tarvis (1809) – 1809 – War of the Fifth Coalition (Napoleonic Wars)
 Battle of Caldiero (1813) – 1813 – War of the Sixth Coalition (Napoleonic Wars)
 Battle of the Mincio River (1814) – 1814 – War of the Sixth Coalition (Napoleonic Wars)
 Siege of Genoa (1814) – 1814 – War of the Sixth Coalition (Napoleonic Wars)
 Battle of the Panaro – 1815 – Neapolitan War (Hundred Days) [Napoleonic Wars]
 Battle of Occhiobello – 1815 – Neapolitan War (Hundred Days) [Napoleonic Wars]
 Battle of Carpi (1815) – 1815 – Neapolitan War (Hundred Days) [Napoleonic Wars]
 Battle of Casaglia – 1815 – Neapolitan War (Hundred Days) [Napoleonic Wars]
 Battle of Ronco – 1815 – Neapolitan War (Hundred Days) [Napoleonic Wars]
 Battle of Cesenatico – 1815 – Neapolitan War (Hundred Days) [Napoleonic Wars]
 Battle of Pesaro – 1815 – Neapolitan War (Hundred Days) [Napoleonic Wars]
 Battle of Scapezzano – 1815 – Neapolitan War (Hundred Days) [Napoleonic Wars]
 Battle of Tolentino – 1815 – Neapolitan War (Hundred Days) [Napoleonic Wars]
 Siege of Ancona – 1815 – Neapolitan War (Hundred Days) [Napoleonic Wars]
 Battle of Castel di Sangro – 1815 – Neapolitan War (Hundred Days) [Napoleonic Wars]
 Battle of San Germano – 1815 – Neapolitan War (Hundred Days) [Napoleonic Wars]
 Siege of Gaeta (1815) – 1815 – Neapolitan War (Hundred Days) [Napoleonic Wars]
 Battle of Solferino – 1859
 Battle of the Piave River – 1918
 Battle of Anzio – 1944
 Battle of Salerno – 1943
 Battle of Monte Cassino – 1944

Jamaica 

 Invasion of Jamaica – 1655 – Anglo-Spanish War (1654–1660) (Franco-Spanish War (1635–1659)) [Thirty Years' War]
 Battle of Ocho Rios – 1657 – Anglo-Spanish War (1654–1660) (Franco-Spanish War (1635–1659)) [Thirty Years' War]
 Battle of Rio Nuevo – 1658 – Anglo-Spanish War (1654–1660) (Franco-Spanish War (1635–1659)) [Thirty Years' War]
 Action of 15 January 1782 – 1782 – American Revolutionary War
 Action of 17 February 1783 – 1783 – American Revolutionary War

Japan
 Battle of Uji (1180) – 1180 – Genpei War
 Siege of Nara – 1180 – Genpei War
 Battle of Ishibashiyama – 1180 – Genpei War
 Battle of Fujigawa – 1180 – Genpei War
 Battle of Sunomata-gawa – 1181 – Genpei War
 Battle of Yahagi-gawa – 1181 – Genpei War
 Siege of Hiuchi – 1183 – Genpei War
 Battle of Kurikara – 1183 – Genpei War
 Battle of Shinohara – 1183 – Genpei War
 Battle of Mizushima – 1183 – Genpei War
 Siege of Fukuryūji – 1183 – Genpei War
 Battle of Muroyama – 1183 – Genpei War
 Siege of Hōjūjidono – 1184 – Genpei War
 Battle of Uji (1184) – 1184 – Genpei War
 Battle of Awazu – 1184 – Genpei War
 Battle of Ichi-no-Tani – 1184 – Genpei War
 Battle of Kojima – 1184 – Genpei War
 Battle of Yashima – 1185 – Genpei War
 Battle of Dan-no-ura – 1185 – Genpei War
 Battle of Bun'ei – 1274 – Mongol invasions of Japan
 Battle of Kōan – 1281 – Mongol invasions of Japan
 Siege of Kasagi – 1331 – Genkō War
 Siege of Akasaka – 1331 – Genkō War
 Siege of Chihaya – 1333 – Genkō War
 Battle of Kotesashi (1333) – 1333 – Genkō War
 Battle of Kumegawa – 1333 – Genkō War
 Battle of Bubaigawara – 1333 – Genkō War
 Siege of Kamakura (1333) – 1333 – Genkō War
 Battle of Tatarahama (1336) – 1336 – Nanboku-chō period
 Battle of Minatogawa – 1336 – Nanboku-chō period
 Siege of Kanegasaki (1337) – 1337 – Nanboku-chō period
 Battle of Fujishima – 1338 – Nanboku-chō period
 Siege of Kuromaku – 1339 – Nanboku-chō period
 Battle of Shijōnawate – 1348 – Nanboku-chō period
 Battle of Yawata – 1353 – Nanboku-chō period
 Battle of Sakainehara – 1478 – Sengoku period
 Siege of Gongenyama – 1510 – Sengoku period
 Siege of Arai – 1516 – Sengoku period
 Battle of Arita-Nakaide – 1517 – Sengoku period
 Siege of Edo – 1524 – Sengoku period
 Battle of Nashinokidaira – 1526 – Sengoku period
 Siege of Kamakura (1526) – 1526 – Sengoku period
 Battle of Ozawahara – 1530 – Sengoku period
 Battle of Idano – 1535 – Sengoku period
 Battle of Sendanno – 1536 – Sengoku period
 Battle of Un no Kuchi – 1536 – Sengoku period
 Siege of Musashi-Matsuyama (1537) – 1537 – Sengoku period
 Battle of Kōnodai (1538) – 1538 – Sengoku period
 Battle of Ichirai – 1539 – Sengoku period
 Battle of Momotsugi – 1539 – Sengoku period
 Siege of Koriyama – 1540 – 1541 – Sengoku period
 Siege of Kuwabara – 1542 – Sengoku period
 Siege of Fukuyo – 1542 – Sengoku period
 Battle of Ankokuji – 1542 – Sengoku period
 Battle of Azukizaka (1542) – 1542 – Sengoku period
 Battle of Sezawa – 1542 – Sengoku period
 Siege of Uehara – 1542 – Sengoku period
 Siege of Gassantoda Castle (1542) – 1542 – 1543 – Sengoku period
 Siege of Nagakubo – 1543 – Sengoku period
 Siege of Kojinyama – 1544 – Sengoku period
 Siege of Kōriyama Castle (1544) – 1544 – Sengoku period
 Siege of Ryūgasaki – 1545 – Sengoku period
 Siege of Takatō (1545) – 1545 – Sengoku period
 Siege of Kawagoe Castle – 1545 – 1546 – Sengoku period
 Siege of Uchiyama – 1546 – Sengoku period
 Siege of Shika Castle – 1547 – Sengoku period
 Battle of Odaihara – 1547 – Sengoku period
 Battle of Kanōguchi – 1547 – Sengoku period
 Battle of Uedahara – 1548 – Sengoku period
 Battle of Shiojiritoge – 1548 – Sengoku period
 Siege of Kajiki – 1549 – Sengoku period
 Siege of Fukashi – 1550 – Sengoku period
 Sieges of Toishi – 1550 – 1551 – Sengoku period
 Battle of Akatsuka – 1552 – Sengoku period
 Battle of Kiyosu Castle – 1552 – 1554 – Sengoku period
 Siege of Katsurao – 1553 – Sengoku period
 Battle of Muraki Castle – 1554 – Sengoku period
 Siege of Kiso Fukushima – 1554 – Sengoku period
 Siege of Kannomine – 1554 – Sengoku period
 Siege of Matsuo – 1554 – Sengoku period
 Siege of Iwatsurugi Castle – 1554 – Sengoku period
 Battle of Oshikibata – 1554 – Sengoku period
 Battle of Miyajima – 1555 – Sengoku period
 Battle of Nagara-gawa – 1556 – Sengoku period
 Battle of Inō – 1556 – Sengoku period
 Siege of Katsurayama – 1557 – Sengoku period
 Siege of Terabe – 1558 – Sengoku period
 Battle of Ukino – 1558 – Sengoku period
 Siege of Marune – 1560 – Sengoku period
 Battle of Okehazama – 1560 – Sengoku period
 Battle of Norada – 1560 – Sengoku period
 Battles of Kawanakajima – 1553, 1555, 1557, 1561 and 1564 – Sengoku period
 Siege of Moji – 1561 – Sengoku period
 Siege of Odawara (1561) – 1561 – Sengoku period
 Siege of Kaminogō Castle – 1562 – Sengoku period
 Battle of Kyōkōji – 1562 – Sengoku period
 Siege of Musashi-Matsuyama (1563) – 1563 – Sengoku period
 Battle of Azukizaka (1564) – 1564 – Sengoku period
 Battle of Kōnodai (1564) – 1564 – Sengoku period
 Siege of Gassantoda Castle (1565) – 1565 – 1566 – Sengoku period
 Siege of Kuragano – 1565 – Sengoku period
 Siege of Minowa – 1566 – Sengoku period
 Siege of Inabayama Castle – 1567 – Sengoku period
 Siege of Hachigata (1568) – 1568 – Sengoku period
 Battle of Torisaka – 1568 – Sengoku period
 Siege of Gassantoda Castle (1569) – 1569 – Sengoku period
 Siege of Kakegawa – 1569 – Sengoku period
 Siege of Odawara (1569) – 1569 – Sengoku period
 Battle of Mimasetoge – 1569 – Sengoku period
 Siege of Kanbara – 1569 – Sengoku period
 Siege of Oguchi Castle – 1569 – Sengoku period
 Siege of Tachibana – 1569 – Sengoku period
 Battle of Tatarahama (1569) – 1569 – Sengoku period
 Siege of Hanazawa – 1570 – Sengoku period
 Siege of Chōkō-ji – 1570 – Sengoku period
 Siege of Kanegasaki (1570) – 1570 – Sengoku period
 Battle of Anegawa – 1570 – Sengoku period
 Siege of Fukazawa – 1571 – Sengoku period
 Siege of Nagashima (1571) – 1571 – Sengoku period
 Siege of Mount Hiei – 1571 – Sengoku period
 Battle of Tonegawa – 1571 – Sengoku period
 Siege of Iwamura Castle – 1572 – Sengoku period
 Siege of Futamata – 1572 – Sengoku period
 Battle of Kizaki – 1572 – Sengoku period
 Siege of Noda Castle – 1573 – Sengoku period
 Battle of Mikatagahara – 1573 – Sengoku period
 Siege of Nagashima (1573) – 1573 – Sengoku period
 Siege of Hikida Castle – 1573 – Sengoku period
 Siege of Ichijōdani Castle – 1573 – Sengoku period
 Siege of Odani Castle – 1573 – Sengoku period
 Siege of Itami (1574) – 1574 – Sengoku period
 Siege of Nagashima (1574) – 1574 – Sengoku period
 Siege of Takatenjin (1574) – 1574 – Sengoku period
 Siege of Yoshida Castle – 1575 – Sengoku period
 Battle of Nagashino – 1575 – Sengoku period
 Siege of Mitsuji – 1576 – Sengoku period
 Battle of Kizugawaguchi (1576) – 1576 – Sengoku period
 Siege of Takabaru – 1576 – Sengoku period
 Siege of Shigisan – 1577 – Sengoku period
 Battle of Tedorigawa – 1577 – Sengoku period
 Siege of Kōzuki Castle – 1578 – Sengoku period
 Siege of Otate – 1578 – Sengoku period
 Battle of Kizugawaguchi (1578) – 1578 – Sengoku period
 Siege of Miki – 1578 – 1580 – Sengoku period
 Battle of Mimigawa – 1578 – Sengoku period
 Siege of Itami (1579) – 1579 – Sengoku period
 Battle of Mimaomote – 1579 – Sengoku period
 Battle of Omosu – 1580 – Sengoku period
 Siege of Takatenjin (1581) – 1580 – 1581 – Sengoku period
 Siege of Hijiyama – 1581 – Sengoku period
 Siege of Tottori – 1581 – Sengoku period
 Siege of Minamata Castle – 1581 – Sengoku period
 Siege of Takatō (1582) – 1582 – Sengoku period
 Battle of Tenmokuzan – 1582 – Sengoku period
 Siege of Takamatsu – 1582 – Sengoku period
 Battle of Uchidehama – 1582 – Sengoku period
 Siege of Uozu – 1582 – Sengoku period
 Battle of Kanagawa – 1582 – Sengoku period
 Battle of Yamazaki – 1582 – Sengoku period
 Battle of Nakatomigawa – 1582 – Sengoku period
 Battle of Hiketa – 1583 – Sengoku period
 Battle of Shizugatake – 1583 – Sengoku period
 Siege of Kaganoi – 1584 – Sengoku period
 Siege of Takehana – 1584 – Sengoku period
 First Siege of Kanie – 1584 – Sengoku period
 Second Siege of Kanie – 1584 – Sengoku period
 Battle of Komaki and Nagakute – 1584 – Sengoku period
 Battle of Okitanawate – 1584 – Sengoku period
 Siege of Negoro-ji – 1585 – Sengoku period
 Siege of Ōta Castle – 1585 – Sengoku period
 Siege of Toyama – 1585 – Sengoku period
 Battle of Hitotoribashi or Battle of Hitadori Bridge – 1586 – Sengoku period
 Siege of Iwaya Castle – 1586 – Sengoku period
 Battle of Hetsugigawa – 1587 – Kyūshū campaign (Sengoku period)
 Battle of Takajō – 1587 – Kyūshū campaign (Sengoku period)
 Siege of Ganjaku – 1587 – Kyūshū campaign (Sengoku period)
 Siege of Akizuki – 1587 – Kyūshū campaign (Sengoku period)
 Battle of Sendaigawa – 1587 – Kyūshū campaign (Sengoku period)
 Siege of Kagoshima – 1587 – Kyūshū campaign (Sengoku period)
 Siege of Kurokawa Castle – 1589 – Sengoku period
 Battle of Suriagehara – 1589 – Sengoku period
 Siege of Hachigata (1590) – 1590 – Sengoku period
 Siege of Odawara (1590) – 1590 – Sengoku period
 Siege of Shimoda – 1590 – Sengoku period
 Siege of Oshi – 1590 – Sengoku period
 Siege of Ueda – 1600 – Sekigahara Campaign (Sengoku period)
 Siege of Fushimi Castle – 1600 – Sekigahara Campaign (Sengoku period)
 Siege of Ōtsu – 1600 – Sekigahara Campaign (Sengoku period)
 Siege of Shiroishi – 1600 – Sekigahara Campaign (Sengoku period)
 Siege of Hataya – 1600 – Sekigahara Campaign (Sengoku period)
 Siege of Kaminoyama – 1600 – Sekigahara Campaign (Sengoku period)
 Siege of Hasedō – 1600 – Sekigahara Campaign (Sengoku period)
 Siege of Tanabe – 1600 – Sekigahara Campaign (Sengoku period)
 Battle of Kuisegawa – 1600 – Sekigahara Campaign (Sengoku period)
 Battle of Sekigahara – 1600 – Sekigahara Campaign (Sengoku period)
 Siege of Udo – 1600 – Sekigahara Campaign (Sengoku period)
 Siege of Yanagawa – 1600 – Sekigahara Campaign (Sengoku period)
 Battle of Shigino – 1614 – Siege of Osaka (Sengoku period)
 Battle of Kizugawa – 1614 – Siege of Osaka (Sengoku period)
 Battle of Imafuku – 1614 – Siege of Osaka (Sengoku period)
 Battle of Kashii – 1615 – Siege of Osaka (Sengoku period)
 Battle of Dōmyōji – 1615 – Siege of Osaka (Sengoku period)
 Battle of Yao (Japan) – 1615 – Siege of Osaka (Sengoku period)
 Battle of Tennōji – 1615 – Siege of Osaka (Sengoku period)
 Battle of Fukae Village – 1637 – Shimabara Rebellion (Edo period)
 Siege of Shimabara Castle – 1637 – 1638 – Shimabara Rebellion (Edo period)
 Battle of Hondo Castle – 1637 – Shimabara Rebellion (Edo period)
 Siege of Tomioka Castle – 1638 – Shimabara Rebellion (Edo period)
 Siege of Hara Castle – 1638 – Shimabara Rebellion (Edo period)
 Battle of Tsushima – 1905 – Russo-Japanese War
 Battle of Iwo Jima – 1945 – World War II
 Battle of Okinawa – 1945 – World War II

Jordan 

 Battle of Gadara – 93 BC
 Siege of Machaerus – 72 – First Jewish–Roman War
 Battle of Mu'tah – 629 – Arab–Byzantine wars
 Battle of Fahl – 635 – Muslim conquest of the Levant (Arab–Byzantine wars)
 Siege of Kerak – 1183 – Crusades
 Siege of Al-Karak (1834) – 1834 – Peasants' revolt in Palestine

Kazakhstan 

 Battle of Zhizhi – 36 BC – Han–Xiongnu War
 Irghiz River Skirmish – 1209 or 1219 – Mongol invasion of the Khwarazmian Empire
 Siege of Otrar – 1219 – 1220 – Mongol invasion of the Khwarazmian Empire

Kenya 

 Battle of Shela – 1812

Korea
See North Korea and South Korea whithin this article.

Kosovo 

 Battle of Kosovo – 1389 – Ottoman conquest of Bosnia and Herzegovina and Serbian-Ottoman wars (Ottoman wars in Europe)
 Battle of Tripolje – 1402 – Serbian-Ottoman wars (Ottoman wars in Europe)
 Siege of Novo Brdo (1440–1441) – 1440 – 1441 – Serbian-Ottoman wars (Ottoman wars in Europe)
 Battle of Kosovo (1448) – 1448 – Ottoman–Hungarian wars (Ottoman wars in Europe)

Kuwait 

 Battle of Chains – 629 or 633 – Muslim conquest of Mesopotamia

Laos
 Battle of Lima Site 85 – 1968 – Vietnam War

Latvia
 Battle of Cēsis – 1210 – Livonian Crusade (Northern Crusades) [Crusades]
 Battle of Ümera – 1210 – Livonian Crusade (Northern Crusades) [Crusades]
 Battle of Turaida – 1211 – Livonian Crusade (Northern Crusades) [Crusades]
 Battle of Riga – 1215 – Livonian Crusade (Northern Crusades) [Crusades]
 Battle of Durbe – 1260 – Livonian Crusade (Northern Crusades) [Crusades]
 Battle of Aizkraukle or Battle of Ascheraden – 1279 – Livonian Crusade (Northern Crusades) [Crusades]
 Battle of Garoza – 1287 – Livonian Crusade (Northern Crusades) [Crusades]
 Battle of Turaida – 1298 – Livonian civil war
 Battle of Ergeme – 1560 – Livonian War (Polish-Russian Wars, Polish–Swedish wars and Russo-Swedish Wars)
 Battle of Wenden (1577) – 1577 – Livonian War (Polish-Russian Wars, Polish–Swedish wars and Russo-Swedish Wars)
 Battle of Wenden (1578) – 1578 – Livonian War (Polish-Russian Wars, Polish–Swedish wars and Russo-Swedish Wars)
 Battle of Wenden (1601) – 1601 – Polish–Swedish War (1600–1611) (Polish–Swedish wars)
 Battle of Kokenhausen – 1601 – Polish–Swedish War (1600–1611) (Polish–Swedish wars)
 Siege of Wolmar – 1601 – Polish–Swedish War (1600–1611) (Polish–Swedish wars)
 Battle of Kircholm – 1605 – Polish–Swedish War (1600–1611) (Polish–Swedish wars)
 Capture of Daugavgrīva – 1608 – Polish–Swedish War (1600–1611) (Polish–Swedish wars)
 Battle of Salis – 1609 – Polish–Swedish War (1600–1611) (Polish–Swedish wars)
 Battle of Daugavgrīva (1609) – 1609 – Polish–Swedish War (1600–1611) (Polish–Swedish wars)
 Battle of Kroppenhof – 1621 – Polish–Swedish War (1621–1625) (Polish–Swedish wars)
 Battle of Listenhoff – 1625 – Polish–Swedish War (1621–1625) (Polish–Swedish wars)
 Battle of Wallhof – 1626 – Polish–Swedish War (1626–1629) (Polish–Swedish wars)
 Battle of Selburg – 1626 – Polish–Swedish War (1626–1629) (Polish–Swedish wars)
 Battle of Wenden (1626) – 1626 – Polish–Swedish War (1626–1629) (Polish–Swedish wars)
 Battle of Treiden (1628) – 1628 – Polish–Swedish War (1626–1629) (Polish–Swedish wars)
 Siege of Dyneburg – 1656 – Russo-Swedish War (1656–1658) (Second Northern War) [Northern Wars]
 Storm of Kokenhusen – 1656 – Russo-Swedish War (1656–1658) (Second Northern War) [Northern Wars]
 Siege of Riga (1656) – 1656 – Russo-Swedish War (1656–1658) (Second Northern War) [Northern Wars]
 Siege of Riga (1700) – 1700 – Great Northern War (Northern Wars)
 Crossing of the Düna – 1701 – Swedish invasion of Poland (1701–1706) (Great Northern War) [Northern Wars]
 Battle of Jakobstadt – 1704 – Swedish invasion of Poland (1701–1706) (Great Northern War) [Northern Wars]
 Battle of Gemauerthof – 1705 – Swedish invasion of Poland (1701–1706) (Great Northern War) [Northern Wars]
 Siege of Riga (1710) – 1710 – Great Northern War (Northern Wars)
 Battle of Ekau – 1812 – French invasion of Russia (Napoleonic Wars)
 Siege of Riga (1812) – 1812 – French invasion of Russia (Napoleonic Wars)
 Battle of Dahlenkirchen – 1812 – French invasion of Russia (Napoleonic Wars)
 Battle of Mesoten – 1812 – French invasion of Russia (Napoleonic Wars)
 Battle of Cēsis – 1919 – Estonian and Latvian War of Independence
 Battle of Daugavpils – 1919 – Latvian War of Independence

Lebanon
 Battle of Djahy – 1178 BC or 1175 BC – Egyptian–Sea People wars
 Rebellion of Byblos – 8th century BC
 Siege of Tyre – 724–720 BC – (by the Assyrians under Shalmaneser V and Sargon II)
  Siege of Tyre – 701 BC – (by the Assyrians under Sennacherib)
 Siege of Tyre – 671 BC – (by the Assyrians under Esarhaddon)
 Siege of Tyre – 663 BC – (by the Assyrians under Ashurbanipal)
 Siege of Tyre – 586 BC – 573 BC – Nebuchadnezzar II's wars
 Siege of Tyre – 332 BC – Wars of Alexander the Great
 Siege of Tyre – 315–314 BC – (by Antigonus I Monophthalmus)
 Battle of Amioun – 649
 Revolt of Tyre (996–998) – 996–998 – (by the Fatimids)
 Siege of Tripoli – 1102 – 1109 – Crusades
 Siege of Beirut (1110) – 1110 – Crusades
 Siege of Sidon – 1110 – Norwegian Crusade (Crusades)
 Siege of Tyre – 1111–1112 – (by the Crusaders under Baldwin I of Jerusalem)
 Siege of Tyre – 1124 – Venetian Crusade (Crusades)
 Battle of al-Buqaia – 1163 – Crusades
 Battle of Marj Ayyun – 1179 – Crusades
 Siege of Tyre (1187) – 1187 – Crusades
 Siege of Tripoli (1271) – 1271 – Crusades
 Fall of Tripoli (1289) – 1289 – Crusades
 Keserwan campaigns – 1292, 1300 and 1305
 Battle of Anjar – 1623
 Battle of Ain Dara – 1711
 Battle of Lake Huleh – 1771
 Russian siege of Beirut – 1772–1773 (Part of Russo-Turkish Wars)
 Battle of Wadi Bakka – 1838
 Bombardment of Beirut (1840) – 1840 – Egyptian–Ottoman War (1839–1841)
 Battle of Sidon (1840) – 1840 – Egyptian–Ottoman War (1839–1841)
 Battle of Damour – 1941
 Battle of the Litani River – 1941
 Battle of Jezzine – 1941
 Battle of Merdjayoun – 1941
 Battle of Beirut – 1941
 Battle of Sidon – 1941
 1948 Arab–Israeli War (small battles on the borders) – 1948
 Battle of the Hotels – 1975–1976
 Battle of Zahleh – 1980–1981
 Siege of Beirut – 1982
 Seven-Day War – 1993
 Battle of Khiam – 2000
 Battle of Maroun al-Ras – 2006
 Battle of Bint Jbeil – 2006
 Battle of Nahr al-Bared – 2007
 Qalamoun offensive – 2014
 Battle of Arsal – 2014
 Qalamoun Offensive – 2017

Libya 

 Siege of Tripoli (1551) – 1551 – Ottoman–Habsburg wars (Ottoman wars in Europe) and Italian War of 1551–1559 (Italian Wars)
 Action of 1 August 1801 – 1801 – First Barbary War (Barbary Wars)
 First Battle of Tripoli Harbor – 1802 – First Barbary War (Barbary Wars)
 Action of 22 June 1803 – 1803 – First Barbary War (Barbary Wars)
 Second Battle of Tripoli Harbor – 1804 – First Barbary War (Barbary Wars)
 Battle of Derna (1805) – 1805 – First Barbary War (Barbary Wars)
 Battle of Tripoli (1825) – 1825 – Sardinian-Tripolitanian war of 1825
 Bombardment of Tripoli (1828) – 1828 – Tripolitan-Neapolitan War

Lithuania
 Battle of Saule – 1236 – Livonian Crusade (Northern Crusades) [Crusades]
 Battle of Memel (1257) – 1257 – Livonian Crusade (Northern Crusades) [Crusades]
 Battle of Skuodas – 1258 or 1259 – Livonian Crusade (Northern Crusades) [Crusades]
 Siege of Christmemel – 1315 – Lithuanian Crusade (Northern Crusades) [Crusades]
 Battle of Medininkai – 1320 – Lithuanian Crusade (Northern Crusades) [Crusades]
 Battle of Memel (1323) – 1323 – Lithuanian Crusade (Northern Crusades) [Crusades]
 Siege of Medvėgalis – 1329 – Lithuanian Crusade (Northern Crusades) [Crusades]
 Siege of Pilėnai – 1336 – Lithuanian Crusade (Northern Crusades) [Crusades]
 Battle of Strėva – 1348 – Lithuanian Crusade (Northern Crusades) [Crusades]
 Siege of Kaunas – 1362 – Lithuanian Crusade (Northern Crusades) [Crusades]
 Battle of Wiłkomierz – 1435 – Lithuanian Civil War (1432–1438)
 Battle of Vilnius (1655) – 1655 – Russo-Polish War (1654–1667) (Polish-Russian Wars)
 Battle of Szkudy – 1658 – Deluge (history) and Second Northern War (Northern Wars)
 Battle of Verkiai – 1658 – Russo-Polish War (1654–1667) (Polish-Russian Wars)
 Battle of Valkininkai (1700) – 1700 – Lithuanian Civil War (1697–1702)
 Battle of Tryškiai – 1701 – Swedish invasion of Poland (1701–1706) (Great Northern War) [Northern Wars]
 Battle of Darsūniškis – 1702 – Swedish invasion of Poland (1701–1706) (Great Northern War) [Northern Wars]
 Battle of Vilnius (1702) – 1702 – Swedish invasion of Poland (1701–1706) (Great Northern War) [Northern Wars]
 Battle of Saločiai (1703) – 1703 – Swedish invasion of Poland (1701–1706) (Great Northern War) [Northern Wars]
 Battle of Palanga – 1705 – Swedish invasion of Poland (1701–1706) (Great Northern War) [Northern Wars]
 Battle of Valkininkai (1706) – 1706 – Swedish invasion of Poland (1701–1706) (Great Northern War) [Northern Wars]
 Battle of Wilno – 1939
 Battle of Raseiniai – 1941

Luxembourg 

 Siege of Luxembourg (1684) – 1684 – War of the Reunions
 Siege of Luxembourg (1794–1795) – 1794 – 1795 – War of the First Coalition (French Revolutionary Wars)

Madagascar
 Battle of Madagascar – 1942 – World War II
 Malagasy Uprising – 1947

Malaysia 

 Capture of Malacca (1511) – 1511 – Portuguese Empire in the Indonesian Archipelago (Portuguese Empire)
 Siege of Malacca (1568) – 1568
 Siege of Malacca (1606) – 1606 – Dutch–Portuguese War
 Battle of Cape Rachado – 1606 – Dutch–Portuguese War
 Battle of Malacca (1641) – 1641 – Dutch–Portuguese War
 Action of 10 September 1782 – 1782 – American Revolutionary War

Malta
 Capture of Malta (218 BC) – 218 BC – Second Punic War (Punic Wars)
 Siege of Melite (870) – c. 870 – Muslim conquest of Sicily (Arab–Byzantine wars)
 Siege of Medina (1053–1054) – 1053 or 1054 – Arab–Byzantine wars
 Norman invasion of Malta – 1091 – Norman conquest of southern Italy (Byzantine–Norman wars)
 Battle of Malta – 1283 – War of the Sicilian Vespers
 Invasion of Gozo – 1551
 Great Siege of Malta – 1565
 Raid of Żejtun – 1614
 French invasion of Malta – 1798 – Mediterranean campaign of 1798 (War of the Second Coalition) [French Revolutionary Wars]
 Siege of Malta (1798–1800) – 1798 – 1800 – Mediterranean campaign of 1798 (War of the Second Coalition) [French Revolutionary Wars]
 Battle of the Malta Convoy – 1800 – Mediterranean campaign of 1798 (War of the Second Coalition) [French Revolutionary Wars]
 Siege of Malta – 1940–1942

Manchuria
 Battle of Sarhū – 1619

Marshall Islands
 Battle of Tarawa

Mauritius 

 Action of 5 May 1794 – 1794 – French Revolutionary Wars
 Battle of Île Ronde – 1794 – French Revolutionary Wars
 Battle of Port Louis – 1799 – French Revolutionary Wars

Mexico 

 Battle of San Juan de Ulúa (1568) – 1568 – Anglo-Spanish trade war (1568-1573)
 Raid on Tabasco (1599) – 1599 – Anglo-Spanish War (1585–1604)
 Capture of Alhóndiga de Granaditas – 1810 – Mexican War of Independence (Spanish American wars of independence)
 Battle of Monte de las Cruces – 1810 – Mexican War of Independence (Spanish American wars of independence)
 Battle of El Veladero – 1810 – 1811 – Mexican War of Independence (Spanish American wars of independence)
 Battle of Calderón Bridge – 1811 – Mexican War of Independence (Spanish American wars of independence)
 Battle of Puerto de Piñones – 1811 – Mexican War of Independence (Spanish American wars of independence)
 Battle of Zacatecas (1811) – 1811 – Mexican War of Independence (Spanish American wars of independence)
 Battle of El Maguey – 1811 – Mexican War of Independence (Spanish American wars of independence)
 Battle of Llanos de Santa Juana – 1811 – Mexican War of Independence (Spanish American wars of independence)
 Battle of Zitácuaro – 1812 – Mexican War of Independence (Spanish American wars of independence)
 Battle of Tecualoya – 1812 – Mexican War of Independence (Spanish American wars of independence)
 Battle of Tenancingo – 1812 – Mexican War of Independence (Spanish American wars of independence)
 Siege of Cuautla – 1812 – Mexican War of Independence (Spanish American wars of independence)
 Battle of Izúcar – 1812 – Mexican War of Independence (Spanish American wars of independence)
 Siege of Huajuapan de León – 1812 – Mexican War of Independence (Spanish American wars of independence)
 Battle of Tenango del Valle – 1812 – Mexican War of Independence (Spanish American wars of independence)
 Battle of Zitlala – 1812 – Mexican War of Independence (Spanish American wars of independence)
 Battle of Escamela – 1812 – Mexican War of Independence (Spanish American wars of independence)
 Capture of Orizaba – 1812 – Mexican War of Independence (Spanish American wars of independence)
 Capture of Oaxaca (1812) – 1812 – Mexican War of Independence (Spanish American wars of independence)
 Siege of Acapulco (1813) – 1813 – Mexican War of Independence (Spanish American wars of independence)
 Battle of La Chincúa – 1813 – Mexican War of Independence (Spanish American wars of independence)
 Battle of Lomas de Santa María – 1813 – Mexican War of Independence (Spanish American wars of independence)
 Battle of Puruarán – 1814 – Mexican War of Independence (Spanish American wars of independence)
 Battle of Temalaca – 1815 – Mexican War of Independence (Spanish American wars of independence)
 Battle of Agua Zarca – 1819 – Mexican War of Independence (Spanish American wars of independence)
 Battle of Azcapotzalco – 1821 – Mexican War of Independence (Spanish American wars of independence)
 Battle of Almolonga – 1823 – Casa Mata Plan Revolution
 Battle of Tampico (1829) – 1829 – Spanish attempts to reconquer Mexico
 Battle of Zacatecas (1835) – 1835 – Zacatecas rebellion of 1835
 Action of April 3, 1836 – 1836 – Texas Revolution
 Battle of Mazocoba – 1900 – Yaqui Wars

Moldova 

 Skirmish at Bender – 1713 – Great Northern War (Northern Wars)
 Battle of Larga – 1770 – Russo-Turkish War (1768–1774)
 Battle of Kagul – 1770 – Russo-Turkish War (1768–1774)
 Battle of Sculeni – 1821 – Greek War of Independence

Mongolia 
 Battle of Mobei – 119 BC – Han–Xiongnu War
 Battle of Buir Lake – 1388
 Battle of Kherlen – 1409
 Battle of Jao Modo – 1696 – Dzungar–Qing Wars
 Battle of Khalkhin Gol – 1939

Montenegro 

 Siege of Castelnuovo – 1539 – Ottoman–Venetian War (1537–1540) (Ottoman–Venetian wars)
 Battle of Perast – 1654 – Cretan War (1645–1669) (Ottoman–Venetian wars)
 Battle on Vrtijeljka – 1685 – Great Turkish War
 Siege of Cattaro – 1813 – 1814 – War of the Sixth Coalition and Adriatic campaign of 1807–1814 (Napoleonic Wars)

Morocco
 Battle of the Muthul – 109 BC – Jugurthine War
 Siege of the fortress at Muluccha – 106 BC – Jugurthine War
 Battle of the Nobles – 740 – Berber Revolt (Berber Wars)
 Battle of Bagdoura – 741 – Berber Revolt (Berber Wars)
 Battle of Salé – 1260 – Reconquista
 Battle of Tangier (1437) – 1437 – Moroccan–Portuguese conflicts (Portuguese Empire) and Reconquista
 Conquest of Asilah – 1471 – Moroccan–Portuguese conflicts (Portuguese Empire) and Reconquista
 Battle of Azemmour – 1513 – Moroccan–Portuguese conflicts (Portuguese Empire)
 Fall of Agadir – 1541 – Moroccan–Portuguese conflicts (Portuguese Empire)
 Battle of Taza (1553) – 1553 – Conflicts between the Regency of Algiers and Morocco
 Capture of Fez (1554) – 1554 – Conflicts between the Regency of Algiers and Morocco and Ottoman expeditions to Morocco
 Battle of Wadi al-Laban – 1558 – Conflicts between the Regency of Algiers and Morocco
 Capture of Fez (1576) – 1576 – Conflicts between the Regency of Algiers and Morocco and Ottoman expeditions to Morocco
 Battle of Alcácer Quibir – 1578 – Moroccan–Portuguese conflicts (Portuguese Empire) and Ottoman–Portuguese confrontations
 Battle of Moulouya – 1692 – Conflicts between the Regency of Algiers and Morocco
 Battle of Cape Spartel – 1782 – American Revolutionary War
 Battle of Tétouan – 1860

Myanmar (formerly Burma)
 Battle of Pagan – 1287 – First Mongol invasion of Burma
 Battle of Naungyo – 1538 – Toungoo–Hanthawaddy War
 Battle of Nonthaburi – 1765 – Burmese–Siamese War (1765–1767)
 Siege of Ayutthaya – 1766 – 1767 – Burmese–Siamese War (1765–1767)
 Battle of Goteik Gorge – 1767 or 1768 – Sino-Burmese War (Ten Great Campaigns)
 Battle of Maymyo – 1768 – Sino-Burmese War (Ten Great Campaigns)
 Battle of Yangon (1824) – 1824 – First Anglo-Burmese War
 Battle of Danubyu – 1825 – First Anglo-Burmese War
 Battle of Prome – 1825 – First Anglo-Burmese War
 Second Anglo-Burmese War – 1852
 Third Anglo-Burmese War – 1885–1887
 Japanese conquest of Burma – January–May 1942
 Battle of Bilin River – 14–18 February 1942
 Battle of Sittang Bridge – 19–23 February 1942
 Battle of Pegu – 3–7 March 1942
 Battle of Taukkyan Roadblock – 7–8 March 1942
 Battle of Tachiao – 18–19 March 1942
 Battle of Toungoo – 19–29 March 1942
 Battle of Oktwin – 20–23 March 1942
 Battle of Toungoo – 24–30 March 1942
 Battle of Yedashe – 5–8 April 1942
 Battle of Szuwa River – 10–16 April 1942
 Battle of Yenangyaung – 11–19 April 1942
 Battle of Mawchi and Bato – Early April 1942
 Battle of Bawlake – 17 April 1942
 Battle of Shwedaung – 1942
 Battle of Prome (1942) – 1942
 Battle of Pyinmana – 17–20 April 1942
 Battle of Loikaw – 20 April 1942
 Battle of Hopong – Taunggyi – 20–24 April 1942
 Battle of Loilem – 25 April 1942
 Battle of Lashio – 29 April 1942
 Battle of Hsenwe – 1 May 1942
 Battle of Salween River – 6–31 May 1942
 Battle of Hsipaw-Mogok Highway – 23 May 1942
 Burma Campaign 1942–1943 – June 1942–December 1943
 Arakan Campaign 1942–1943 – December 1942–May 1943
 First Chindit Expedition – 8 February–late April 1943
 Battle of Yupang – October–December 1943
 Burma Campaign 1944 – January–November 1944
 Battle of Lashio – January 1944
 Battle of the Admin Box – 5–23 February 1944 (also known as the Battle of Ngakyedauk or the Battle of Sinzweya)
 Second Chindit Expedition – 5 February–17 August 1944
 Battle of Maingkwan – February-5 March 1944
 Battle of Mogaung – March 1944
 Battle of Imphal – 8 March–3 July 1944
 Battle of Sangshak – 20–26 March 1944
 Battle of Kohima – 4 April–22 June 1944
 Siege of Myitkyina – April–August 1944
 Burma Campaign 1944–1945 – November 1944–July 1945
 Battle of Mongyu – December 1944-January 1945
 Battle of Ramree Island – 21 January–20 February 1945
 Battle of Meiktila and Mandalay – January–March 1945 (also known as the Battle of Central Burma)
 Battle of Pokoku and Irrawaddy River operations – 4 February–13 May 1945
 Battle of Lashio – March 1945
 Battle of Hsipaw – March 1945
 Battle for Pegu – 27–30 April 1945
 Battle of Elephant Point – 1–2 May 1945

Namibia
 Battle of Waterberg – 1904
 Battle of Sandfontein – 1914
 Battle of Trekkopjes – 1915
 Battle of Otavi – 1915

Nauru 

 Operation RY – 1942 – Pacific War (World War II)

Nepal 

 Battle of Jit Gadhi – 1814 – Anglo-Nepalese War
 Battle of Makwanpur (1816) – 1816 – Anglo-Nepalese War

Netherlands
 Battle of Baduhenna Wood – 28 – Roman–Germanic wars
 Battle of Dorestad – c. 695 – Frisian–Frankish wars
 Battle of the Boarn – 734 – Frisian–Frankish wars
 Siege of Asselt – 882 – Viking expansion
 Battle of Vlaardingen – 1018
 Battle of Zierikzee – 1304 – Franco-Flemish War
 Battle of Cadzand – 1337 – Edwardian Phase (Hundred Years' War)
 Battle of Arnemuiden – 1338 – Edwardian Phase (Hundred Years' War)
 Battle of Sluys or Battle of l'Écluse – 1340 – Edwardian Phase (Hundred Years' War)
 Battle of Heiligerlee (1536) – 1536 – Guelders Wars and Count's Feud (European wars of religion)
 Battle of Heiligerlee (1568) – 1568 – Eighty Years' War, 1566–1572 (Eighty Years' War) [European wars of religion]
 Capture of Brielle – 1572 – Eighty Years' War, 1572–1576 (Eighty Years' War) [European wars of religion]
 Relief of Goes – 1572 – Anglo-Spanish War (1585–1604) and Eighty Years' War, 1572–1576 (Eighty Years' War) [European wars of religion]
 Massacre of Naarden – 1572 – Eighty Years' War, 1572–1576 (Eighty Years' War) [European wars of religion]
 Siege of Middelburg (1572–1574) – 1572 – 1574 – Anglo-Spanish War and Eighty Years' War, 1572–1576 (Eighty Years' War) [European wars of religion]
 Siege of Haarlem – 1572 – 1573 – Anglo-Spanish War and Eighty Years' War, 1572–1576 (Eighty Years' War) [European wars of religion]
 Battle of Flushing – 1573 – Eighty Years' War, 1572–1576 (Eighty Years' War) [European wars of religion]
 Battle of Borsele – 1573 – Eighty Years' War, 1572–1576 (Eighty Years' War) [European wars of religion]
 Battle of Haarlemmermeer – 1573 – Eighty Years' War, 1572–1576 (Eighty Years' War) [European wars of religion]
 Siege of Alkmaar – 1573 – Eighty Years' War, 1572–1576 (Eighty Years' War) [European wars of religion]
 Capture of Geertruidenberg (1573) – 1573 – Anglo-Spanish War and Eighty Years' War, 1572–1576 (Eighty Years' War) [European wars of religion]
 Siege of Leiden – 1573 – 1574 – Anglo-Spanish War and Eighty Years' War, 1572–1576 (Eighty Years' War) [European wars of religion]
 Battle of Delft (1573) – 1573 – Anglo-Spanish War and Eighty Years' War, 1572–1576 (Eighty Years' War) [European wars of religion]
 Battle on the Zuiderzee – 1573 – Eighty Years' War, 1572–1576 (Eighty Years' War) [European wars of religion]
 Battle of the Scheldt (1574) or Battle of Walcharen – 1574 – Anglo-Spanish War and Eighty Years' War, 1572–1576 (Eighty Years' War) [European wars of religion]
 Capture of Valkenburg (1574) – 1574 – Anglo-Spanish War and Eighty Years' War, 1572–1576 (Eighty Years' War) [European wars of religion]
 Battle of Mookerheyde – 1574 – Eighty Years' War, 1572–1576 (Eighty Years' War) [European wars of religion]
 Siege of Oudewater (1575) – 1575 – Eighty Years' War, 1572–1576 (Eighty Years' War) [European wars of religion]
 Siege of Schoonhoven (1575) – 1575 – Anglo-Spanish War and Eighty Years' War, 1572–1576 (Eighty Years' War) [European wars of religion]
 Siege of Zierikzee – 1575 – 1576 – Eighty Years' War, 1572–1576 (Eighty Years' War) [European wars of religion]
 Siege of Deventer (1578) – 1578 – Eighty Years' War, 1576–1579 (Eighty Years' War) [European wars of religion]
 Siege of Maastricht (1579) – 1579 – Eighty Years' War, 1579–1588 (Eighty Years' War) [European wars of religion]
 Siege of Steenwijk (1580–1581) – 1580 – 1581 – Anglo-Spanish War and Eighty Years' War, 1579–1588 (Eighty Years' War) [European wars of religion]
 Battle of Kollum – 1581 – Anglo-Spanish War and Eighty Years' War, 1579–1588 (Eighty Years' War) [European wars of religion]
 Capture of Breda (1581) – 1581 – Eighty Years' War, 1579–1588 (Eighty Years' War) [European wars of religion]
 Battle of Noordhorn – 1581 – Anglo-Spanish War and Eighty Years' War, 1579–1588 (Eighty Years' War) [European wars of religion]
 Siege of Niezijl – 1581 – Anglo-Spanish War and Eighty Years' War, 1579–1588 (Eighty Years' War) [European wars of religion]
 Siege of Lochem (1582) – 1582 – Anglo-Spanish War and Eighty Years' War, 1579–1588 (Eighty Years' War) [European wars of religion]
 Siege of Eindhoven (1583) – 1583 – Anglo-Spanish War and Eighty Years' War, 1579–1588 (Eighty Years' War) [European wars of religion]
 Battle of Steenbergen (1583) – 1583 – Anglo-Spanish War and Eighty Years' War, 1579–1588 (Eighty Years' War) [European wars of religion]
 Siege of IJsseloord or Capture of Arnhem – 1585 – Anglo-Spanish War and Eighty Years' War, 1579–1588 and Anglo-Spanish War (1585–1604) (Eighty Years' War) [European wars of religion]
 Battle of Empel or Miracle of Empel – 1585 – Eighty Years' War, 1579–1588 (Eighty Years' War) [European wars of religion]
 Battle of Boksum – 1586 – Eighty Years' War, 1579–1588 (Eighty Years' War) [European wars of religion]
 Siege of Grave (1586) – 1586 – Anglo-Spanish War (1585–1604) and Eighty Years' War, 1579–1588 and Anglo-Spanish War (1585–1604) (Eighty Years' War) [European wars of religion]
 Siege of Venlo (1586) – 1586 – Anglo-Spanish War (1585–1604) and Eighty Years' War, 1579–1588 and Anglo-Spanish War (1585–1604) (Eighty Years' War) [European wars of religion]
 Capture of Axel – 1586 – Anglo-Spanish War (1585–1604) and Eighty Years' War, 1579–1588 and Anglo-Spanish War (1585–1604) (Eighty Years' War) [European wars of religion]
 Battle of Zutphen – 1586 – Eighty Years' War, 1579–1588 and Anglo-Spanish War (158)5–1604) (Eighty Years' War) [European wars of religion]
 Siege of Sluis (1587) – 1587 – Eighty Years' War, 1579–1588 and Anglo-Spanish War (1585–1604) (Eighty Years' War) [European wars of religion]
 Siege of Bergen op Zoom (1588) – 1588 – Anglo-Spanish War (1585–1604) and Ten Years (Eighty Years' War) (Eighty Years' War) [European wars of religion]
 Capture of Geertruidenberg (1589) – 1589 – Anglo-Spanish War (1585–1604) and Ten Years (Eighty Years' War) (Eighty Years' War) [European wars of religion]
 Assault on Nijmegen – 1589 – Cologne War (European wars of religion)
 Capture of Breda (1590) – 1590 – Anglo-Spanish War (1585–1604) and Ten Years (Eighty Years' War) (Eighty Years' War) [European wars of religion]
 Siege of Zutphen (1591) – 1591 – Anglo-Spanish War (1585–1604) and Ten Years (Eighty Years' War) (Eighty Years' War) [European wars of religion]
 Siege of Deventer (1591) – 1591 – Anglo-Spanish War (1585–1604) and Ten Years (Eighty Years' War) (Eighty Years' War) [European wars of religion]
 Capture of Delfzijl – 1591 – Anglo-Spanish War (1585–1604) and Ten Years (Eighty Years' War) (Eighty Years' War) [European wars of religion]
 Siege of Knodsenburg – 1591 – Anglo-Spanish War (1585–1604) and Ten Years (Eighty Years' War) (Eighty Years' War) [European wars of religion]
 Siege of Hulst (1591) – 1591 – Anglo-Spanish War (1585–1604) and Ten Years (Eighty Years' War) (Eighty Years' War) [European wars of religion]
 Siege of Nijmegen (1591) – 1591 – Anglo-Spanish War (1585–1604) and Ten Years (Eighty Years' War) (Eighty Years' War) [European wars of religion]
 Siege of Steenwijk (1592) – 1592 – Anglo-Spanish War (1585–1604) and Ten Years (Eighty Years' War) (Eighty Years' War) [European wars of religion]
 Siege of Coevorden (1592) – 1592 – Anglo-Spanish War (1585–1604) and Ten Years (Eighty Years' War) (Eighty Years' War) [European wars of religion]
 Siege of Geertruidenberg (1593) – 1593 – Anglo-Spanish War (1585–1604) and Ten Years (Eighty Years' War) (Eighty Years' War) [European wars of religion]
 Siege of Coevorden (1593) – 1593 – Anglo-Spanish War (1585–1604) and Ten Years (Eighty Years' War) (Eighty Years' War) [European wars of religion]
 Siege of Groningen (1594) – 1594 – Anglo-Spanish War (1585–1604) and Ten Years (Eighty Years' War) (Eighty Years' War) [European wars of religion]
 Siege of Groenlo (1595) – 1595 – Anglo-Spanish War (1585–1604) and Ten Years (Eighty Years' War) (Eighty Years' War) [European wars of religion]
 Siege of Hulst (1596) – 1596 – Anglo-Spanish War (1585–1604) and Ten Years (Eighty Years' War) (Eighty Years' War) [European wars of religion]
 Siege of Groenlo (1597) – 1597 – Anglo-Spanish War (1585–1604) and Ten Years (Eighty Years' War) (Eighty Years' War) [European wars of religion]
 Siege of Bredevoort (1597) – 1597 – Anglo-Spanish War (1585–1604) and Ten Years (Eighty Years' War) (Eighty Years' War) [European wars of religion]
 Capture of Enschede (1597) – 1597 – Anglo-Spanish War (1585–1604) and Ten Years (Eighty Years' War) (Eighty Years' War) [European wars of religion]
 Capture of Ootmarsum – 1597 – Anglo-Spanish War (1585–1604) and Ten Years (Eighty Years' War) (Eighty Years' War) [European wars of religion]
 Siege of Oldenzaal (1597) – 1597 – Anglo-Spanish War (1585–1604) and Ten Years (Eighty Years' War) (Eighty Years' War) [European wars of religion]
 Siege of Zaltbommel – 1599 – Anglo-Spanish War (1585–1604) and Eighty Years' War, 1599–1609 (Eighty Years' War) [European wars of religion]
 Siege of San Andreas (1600) – 1600 – Anglo-Spanish War (1585–1604) and Eighty Years' War, 1599–1609 (Eighty Years' War) [European wars of religion]
 Battle of Lekkerbeetje – 1600 – Eighty Years' War, 1599–1609 (Eighty Years' War) [European wars of religion]
 Siege of 's-Hertogenbosch (1601) – 1601 – Anglo-Spanish War (1585–1604) and Eighty Years' War, 1599–1609 (Eighty Years' War) [European wars of religion]
 Siege of Grave (1602) – 1602 – Anglo-Spanish War (1585–1604) and Eighty Years' War, 1599–1609 (Eighty Years' War) [European wars of religion]
 Siege of Sluis (1604) – 1604 – Anglo-Spanish War (1585–1604) and Eighty Years' War, 1599–1609 (Eighty Years' War) [European wars of religion]
 Siege of Bergen op Zoom (1622) – 1622 – Eighty Years' War, 1621–1648 (Eighty Years' War and Thirty Years' War) [European wars of religion]
 Siege of Breda (1624) – 1624 – 1625 – Anglo-Spanish War (1625–1630) and Eighty Years' War, 1621–1648 (Eighty Years' War and Thirty Years' War) [European wars of religion]
 Siege of Oldenzaal (1626) – 1626 – Anglo-Spanish War (1625–1630) and Eighty Years' War, 1621–1648 (Eighty Years' War and Thirty Years' War) [European wars of religion]
 Siege of Groenlo (1627) – 1627 – Anglo-Spanish War (1625–1630) and Eighty Years' War, 1621–1648 (Eighty Years' War and Thirty Years' War) [European wars of religion]
 Siege of 's-Hertogenbosch – 1629 – Anglo-Spanish War (1625–1630) and Eighty Years' War, 1621–1648 (Eighty Years' War and Thirty Years' War) [European wars of religion]
 Battle of the Slaak – 1631 – Eighty Years' War, 1621–1648 (Eighty Years' War and Thirty Years' War) [European wars of religion]
 Capture of Maastricht – 1632 – Eighty Years' War, 1621–1648 (Eighty Years' War and Thirty Years' War) [European wars of religion]
 Capture of Saint Martin (1633) – 1633 – Eighty Years' War, 1621–1648 (Eighty Years' War and Thirty Years' War) [European wars of religion]
 Siege of Breda (1637) – 1637 – Eighty Years' War, 1621–1648 (Eighty Years' War and Thirty Years' War) [European wars of religion]
 Siege of Venlo (1637) – 1637 – Eighty Years' War, 1621–1648 (Eighty Years' War and Thirty Years' War) [European wars of religion]
 Attack on Saint Martin – 1644 – Eighty Years' War, 1621–1648 (Eighty Years' War and Thirty Years' War) [European wars of religion]
 Siege of Hulst (1645) – 1645 – Eighty Years' War, 1621–1648 (Eighty Years' War and Thirty Years' War) [European wars of religion]
 Battle of Scheveningen – 1653 – First Anglo-Dutch War (Anglo-Dutch Wars)
 Holmes's Bonfire – 1666 – Second Anglo-Dutch War (Anglo-Dutch Wars)
 Siege of Groenlo (1672) – 1672 – Franco-Dutch War
 Siege of Groningen (1672) – 1672 – Franco-Dutch War
 Battle of Schooneveld – 1673 – Third Anglo-Dutch War (Franco-Dutch War and Anglo-Dutch Wars)
 Siege of Maastricht (1673)) – 1673 – Franco-Dutch War
 Battle of Texel – 1673 – Third Anglo-Dutch War (Franco-Dutch War and Anglo-Dutch Wars)
 Siege of Maastricht (1676)) – 1676 – Franco-Dutch War
 Battle of Texel (1694) – 1694 – Nine Years' War
 Siege of Bergen op Zoom (1747) – 1747 – War of the Austrian Succession
 Siege of Maastricht (1748) – 1748 – War of the Austrian Succession
 Capture of Sint Eustatius – 1781 – Fourth Anglo-Dutch War (American Revolutionary War)
 Siege of Maastricht (1793) – 1793 – War of the First Coalition (French Revolutionary Wars)
 Siege of Breda (1793) – 1793 – War of the First Coalition (French Revolutionary Wars)
 Battle of Boxtel – 1794 – War of the First Coalition (French Revolutionary Wars)
 Battle of Puiflijk – 1794 – War of the First Coalition (French Revolutionary Wars)
 Siege of Nijmegen (1794) – 1794 – War of the First Coalition (French Revolutionary Wars)
 Capture of the Dutch fleet at Den Helder – 1795 – War of the First Coalition (French Revolutionary Wars)
 Action of 12 May 1796 – 1796 – War of the First Coalition (French Revolutionary Wars)
 Battle of Camperdown – 1797 – War of the First Coalition (French Revolutionary Wars)
 Battle of Callantsoog – 1799 – War of the Second Coalition (French Revolutionary Wars)
 Vlieter incident – 1799 – War of the Second Coalition (French Revolutionary Wars)
 Battle of Krabbendam – 1799 – War of the Second Coalition (French Revolutionary Wars)
 Battle of Bergen (1799) – 1799 – War of the Second Coalition (French Revolutionary Wars)
 Battle of Alkmaar (1799) – 1799 – War of the Second Coalition (French Revolutionary Wars)
 Battle of Castricum – 1799 – War of the Second Coalition (French Revolutionary Wars)
 Invasion of Curaçao (1800) – 1800 – Quasi-War (French Revolutionary Wars)
 Siege of Naarden (1813–1814) – 1813 – 1814 – War of the Sixth Coalition (Napoleonic Wars)
 Battle of Arnhem (1813) – 1813 – War of the Sixth Coalition (Napoleonic Wars)
 Siege of Breda (1813) – 1813 – War of the Sixth Coalition (Napoleonic Wars)
 Siege of Bergen op Zoom (1814) – 1814 – War of the Sixth Coalition (Napoleonic Wars)
 Battle of the Grebbeberg – 1940
 Battle of the Afsluitdijk – 1940
 Operation Market Garden – 1944
 Battle of Overloon – 1944
 Battle of the Scheldt – 1944

New Zealand
 Battle of Ohaeawai – 1845

Nicaragua
 Battle for Río San Juan de Nicaragua – 1762 – Anglo-Spanish War (1762–1763) (Seven Years' War)
 Battle of Rivas – 1856

Nigeria 

 Battle of Tabkin Kwatto – 1804 – Fulani War
 Battle of Tsuntua – 1804 – Fulani War

North Korea 

 Battle of Salsu – 612 – Goguryeo–Sui War
 Battle of Sasu – 662 – Goguryeo–Tang War
 Siege of Kuju – 1231 – 1232 – Mongol invasions of Korea
 Siege of Pyongyang (1592) – 1592 – Japanese invasions of Korea (1592–1598)
 Battle of Pyongyang (1592) – 1592 – Japanese invasions of Korea (1592–1598)
 Battle of Yonan – 1592 – Japanese invasions of Korea (1592–1598)
 Battle of Bukgwan – 1592 – Japanese invasions of Korea (1592–1598)
 Siege of Pyongyang (1593) – 1593 – Japanese invasions of Korea (1592–1598)

North Macedonia 

 Battle of Skopje – 1004 – Byzantine conquest of Bulgaria (Byzantine–Bulgarian wars)
 Battle of Strumica – 1014 – Byzantine conquest of Bulgaria (Byzantine–Bulgarian wars)
 Battle of Bitola – 1015 – Byzantine conquest of Bulgaria (Byzantine–Bulgarian wars)
 Battle of Mokra (1445) – 1445 – Skanderbeg's rebellion (Ottoman wars in Europe)
 Battle of Otonetë – 1446 – Skanderbeg's rebellion (Ottoman wars in Europe)
 Siege of Svetigrad (1448) – 1448 – Skanderbeg's rebellion (Ottoman wars in Europe)
 Battle of Oranik – 1448 – Albanian–Venetian War and Skanderbeg's rebellion (Ottoman-Albanian Wars)
 Battle of Polog – 1453 – Skanderbeg's rebellion (Ottoman wars in Europe)
 Battle of Oranik (1456) – 1456 – Skanderbeg's rebellion (Ottoman wars in Europe)
 Battle of Ohrid – 1464 – Skanderbeg's rebellion and First Ottoman–Venetian War (Ottoman–Venetian wars) [Ottoman wars in Europe]
 Battle of Vaikal – 1465 – Skanderbeg's rebellion (Ottoman wars in Europe)
 Battle of Meçad (1465) – 1465 – Skanderbeg's rebellion (Ottoman wars in Europe)

Norway
 Battle of Hakadal – c. 860 – Unification of Norway
 Battle of Orkdal – c. 870 – Unification of Norway
 First battle of Solskjel – c. 870 – Unification of Norway
 Second battle of Solskjel – c. 870 – Unification of Norway
 Battle of Fjaler – c. 880 – Unification of Norway
 Battle of Hafrsfjord – between 872 and 900 – Unification of Norway
 Battle of Nesjar – 1016
 Battle of Stiklestad – 1030
 Battle of Kringen – 1612 – Kalmar War
 Battle of Vågen – 1665 – Second Anglo-Dutch War (Anglo-Dutch Wars)
 Battle of Høland – 1716 – Norway during the Great Northern War (Great Northern War) [Northern Wars]
 Siege of Fredriksten – 1718 – Norway during the Great Northern War (Great Northern War) [Northern Wars]
 Action of 22 August 1795 – 1795 – War of the First Coalition (French Revolutionary Wars)
 Battle of Lier (1808) – 1808 – Dano-Swedish War of 1808–1809 (Napoleonic Wars)
 Battle of Toverud – 1808 – Dano-Swedish War of 1808–1809 (Napoleonic Wars)
 Battle of Rødenes – 1808 – Dano-Swedish War of 1808–1809 (Napoleonic Wars)
 Battle of Trangen – 1808 – Dano-Swedish War of 1808–1809 (Napoleonic Wars)
 Battle of Alvøen – 1808 – Gunboat War
 Battle of Mobekk – 1808 – Dano-Swedish War of 1808–1809 (Napoleonic Wars)
 Battle of Prestebakke – 1808 – Dano-Swedish War of 1808–1809 (Napoleonic Wars)
 Battle of Berby – 1808 – Dano-Swedish War of 1808–1809 (Napoleonic Wars)
 Battle of Silda – 1810 – Gunboat War
 Battle of Lyngør – 1812 – Gunboat War
 Invasion of Hvaler – 1814 – Swedish–Norwegian War (1814) (Napoleonic Wars)
 Battle of Tistedalen – 1814 – Swedish–Norwegian War (1814) (Napoleonic Wars)
 Battle of Lier (1814) – 1814 – Swedish–Norwegian War (1814) (Napoleonic Wars)
 Siege of Fredrikstad – 1814 – Swedish–Norwegian War (1814) (Napoleonic Wars)
 Battle of Matrand – 1814 – Swedish–Norwegian War (1814) (Napoleonic Wars)
 Battle of Rakkestad – 1814 – Swedish–Norwegian War (1814) (Napoleonic Wars)
 Battle of Langnes – 1814 – Swedish–Norwegian War (1814) (Napoleonic Wars)
 Battle of Kjølberg Bridge – 1814 – Swedish–Norwegian War (1814) (Napoleonic Wars)
 Battle of Drøbak Sound – 1940
 Battles of Narvik – 1940
 Battle of Midtskogen – 1940
 Battle of Dombås – 1940
 Namsos campaign – 1940
 Åndalsnes landings – 1940
 Battle of Hegra Fortress – 1940
 Battle of Vinjesvingen – 1940
 Battle of the North Cape – 1943

Oman
 Capture of Muscat (1552) – 1552 – Ottoman campaign against Hormuz (Ottoman–Portuguese conflicts (1538–1559)) [Ottoman–Portuguese confrontations]
 Battle of the Strait of Hormuz (1553) – 1553 – Ottoman campaign against Hormuz (Ottoman–Portuguese conflicts (1538–1559)) [Ottoman–Portuguese confrontations]
 Battle of the Gulf of Oman – 1554 – Ottoman campaign against Hormuz (Ottoman–Portuguese conflicts (1538–1559)) [Ottoman–Portuguese confrontations]
 Battle off Hormuz (1625) – 1625 – Dutch–Portuguese War
 Battle of Mirbat – 1972 – Dhofar Rebellion

Pakistan
 Battle of the Ten Kings – c. 14th century BC
 Battle of the Hydaspes River – 326 BC – Indian campaign of Alexander the Great (Wars of Alexander the Great)
 Battle of Rasil – 644 – Muslim conquests in the Indian subcontinent
 Battle of Peshawar (1001) – 1001 – Muslim conquests in the Indian subcontinent
 Battle of Chach – 1008
 Battle of the Indus – 1221 – Mongol invasion of the Khwarazmian Empire
 Battle of Sivistan – 1298 – Mongol invasions of India
 Battle of the Gulf of Oman – 1554 – Ottoman campaign against Hormuz (Ottoman–Portuguese conflicts (1538–1559)) [Ottoman–Portuguese confrontations]
 Battle of Kartarpur – 1635 – Mughal-Sikh War
 Battle of Lahore (1759) – 1759 – Indian campaign of Ahmad Shah Durrani (Afghan–Sikh Wars)
 Battle of Sialkot (1761) – 1761 – Indian campaign of Ahmad Shah Durrani (Afghan–Sikh Wars)
 Battle of Gujranwala (1761) – 1761 – Indian campaign of Ahmad Shah Durrani (Afghan–Sikh Wars)
 Siege of Lahore (1761) – 1761 – Indian campaign of Ahmad Shah Durrani (Afghan–Sikh Wars)
 Battle of Sialkot (1763) – 1763 – Indian campaign of Ahmad Shah Durrani (Afghan–Sikh Wars)
 Battle of Rohtas (1779) – 1779 – Afghan–Sikh Wars
 Battle of Kasur – 1807 – Afghan–Sikh Wars
 Battle of Attock (1813) – 1813 – Afghan–Sikh Wars
 Siege of Multan (1818) – 1818 – Afghan–Sikh Wars
 Battle of Nowshera – 1823 – Afghan–Sikh Wars
 Battle of Peshawar (1834) – 1834 – Afghan–Sikh Wars
 Battle of Jamrud – 1837 – Afghan–Sikh Wars
 Siege of Kahun – 1840 – First Anglo-Afghan War (Great Game)
 Action at Hykulzye – 1842 – First Anglo-Afghan War (Great Game)
 Siege of Multan – 1848
 Battle of Kineyree – 1848
 Battle of Ramnagar – 1848
 Battle of Sadullapur
 Battle of Chilianwala – 1849
 Battle of Gujrat – 1849
 Battle of Chawinda – 1965 – (Indo-Pakistani war)
 Battle of Miani – 1843 – (then Indian Empire)
 Battle of Basantar – 1971 – Indo-Pakistani War of 1971

Palestine 

 Siege of Gaza – 332 BC – Wars of Alexander the Great
 Battle of Gaza (312 BC) – 312 BC – Third War of the Diadochi
 Battle of Raphia – 217 BC – Fourth Syrian War
 Battle of the Ascent of Lebonah – 167 BC or 166 BC – Maccabean Revolt
 Battle of Beth Horon (166 BC) – 166 BC – Maccabean Revolt
 Battle of Emmaus – 165 BC – Maccabean Revolt
 Battle of Beth Zur – 164 BC – Maccabean Revolt
 Battle of Beth Zechariah – 162 BC – Maccabean Revolt
 Battle of Elasa – 160 BC – Maccabean Revolt
 Siege of Herodium – 71 – First Jewish–Roman War
 Siege of Herodium – 134 – Bar Kokhba revolt
 Siege of Betar – 135 – Bar Kokhba revolt
 Battle of Dathin – 634 – Arab–Byzantine wars
 Battle of Nāblus (1260) – 1260 – Mongol invasions of the Levant
 Battle of Yaunis Khan – 1516 – Ottoman–Mamluk War (1516–1517) (Ottoman wars in Asia)
 Battle of Hebron – 1834 – Peasants' revolt in Palestine

Panama 

 Drake's Assault on Panama – 1596 – Anglo-Spanish War (1585–1604)
 Capture of Portobello (1601) – 1601 – Anglo-Spanish War (1585–1604)
 Blockade of Porto Bello – 1726 – 1728 – Anglo-Spanish War (1727–1729)
 Battle of Porto Bello (1739) – 1739 – War of Jenkins' Ear (War of the Austrian Succession)

Papua New Guinea
 Battle of Milne Bay – 1942
 Battle of Savo Island – 1942
 Battle of Buna-Gona – 1942
 Battle of the Bismarck Sea – 1943

Paraguay 

 Battle of Campichuelo – 1810 – Paraguay campaign (Argentine War of Independence)
 Battle of Paraguarí – 1811 – Paraguay campaign (Argentine War of Independence)
 Battle of Tacuarí – 1811 – Paraguay campaign (Argentine War of Independence)

Peru
 Battle of Chillopampa – 1531 – Inca Civil War
 Battle of Huanucopampa – 1532 – Inca Civil War
 Battle of Quipaipán – 1532 – Inca Civil War
 Battle of Cajamarca or Battle of Cajamalca – 1532 – Spanish conquest of the Inca Empire
 Battle of Vilcaconga – 1533 – Spanish conquest of the Inca Empire
 Battle of Cuzco – 1533 – Spanish conquest of the Inca Empire
 Battle of Maraycalla – 1534 – Spanish conquest of the Inca Empire
 Siege of Cusco – 1536 – 1537 – Spanish conquest of the Inca Empire
 Battle of Ollantaytambo – 1537 – Spanish conquest of the Inca Empire
 Battle of Abancay – 1537 – Spanish conquest of the Inca Empire
 Battle of Las Salinas – 1538 – Spanish conquest of the Inca Empire
 Battle of Chupas – 1542 – Spanish conquest of the Inca Empire
 Battle of Jaquijahuana – 1548 – Spanish conquest of the Inca Empire
 Capture of the frigate Esmeralda – 1820 – Chilean War of Independence and Peruvian War of Independence (Spanish American wars of independence)
 First siege of Callao – 1821 – Peruvian War of Independence
 Battle of Zepita – 1823 – Peruvian War of Independence
 Battle of Junín – 1824 – Peruvian War of Independence
 Second siege of Callao – 1824 – 1826 – Peruvian War of Independence
 Battle of Ayacucho – 1824 – Peruvian War of Independence
 Battle of Punta Malpelo – 1828 – Gran Colombia–Peru War
 Battle of Islay – 1838 – War of the Confederation
 Battle of Portada de Guías – 1838 – War of the Confederation
 Third siege of Callao – 1838 – War of the Confederation
 Battle of Callao (1838) – 1838 – War of the Confederation
 Battle of Buin – 1839 – War of the Confederation
 Battle of Casma – 1839 – War of the Confederation
 Battle of Yungay – 1839 – War of the Confederation
 Battle of Callao – 1866 – Chincha Islands War
 Battle of Miraflores – 1881 – War of the Pacific
 Battle of Callao – 1881 – War of the Pacific
 Battle of La Concepción – 1882 – War of the Pacific
 Battle of Huamachuco – 1883 – War of the Pacific

Philippines
 Battle of Mactan – 1521
 Battle of Manila (1570) – 1570 – History of the Philippines (1565–1898)
 Battle of Bangkusay – 1571 – History of the Philippines (1565–1898)
 Battle of Manila (1574) – 1574 – History of the Philippines (1565–1898)
 Battle of Playa Honda – 1617 – Eighty Years' War (European wars of religion)
 Battles of La Naval de Manila – 1646 – Eighty Years' War, 1621–1648 (Eighty Years' War and Thirty Years' War) [European wars of religion]
 Battle of Puerto de Cavite – 1647 – Eighty Years' War, 1621–1648 (Eighty Years' War and Thirty Years' War) [European wars of religion]
 Battle of Manila (1762) – 1762 – Anglo-Spanish War (1762–1763) (Seven Years' War)
 Action of 30 October 1762 – 1762 – Anglo-Spanish War (1762–1763) (Seven Years' War)
 Raid on Manila – 1798 – French Revolutionary Wars
 Battle of Binakayan-Dalahican – 1896
 Battle of Manila Bay – 1898
 Battle of Tirad Pass – 1899
 Battle of Bataan – 1942
 Battle of Corregidor – 1942
 Battle of the Philippine Sea – 1944
 Battle of Leyte Gulf – 1944
 Battle of Leyte – 1945
 Battle of Luzon – 1944
 Battle of Mindanao – 1945
 Battle of Davao – 1945
 Battle of Maguindanao – 1945
 Battle of Basilan – 2014

Poland
 Battle of Cedynia – 972 – First Polish–German War
 Battle of Nakło (1109) – 1109
 Siege of Głogów – 1109
 Battle of Hundsfeld – 1109
 Battle of Słońca – 1238 – First war against Swietopelk II
 Sack of Sandomierz (1241) – 1241 – First Mongol invasion of Poland
 Battle of Tursko – 1241 – First Mongol invasion of Poland
 Battle of Tarczek – 1241 – First Mongol invasion of Poland
 Battle of Chmielnik – 1241 – First Mongol invasion of Poland
 Battle of Racibórz – 1241 – First Mongol invasion of Poland
 Sack of Kraków (1241) – 1241 – First Mongol invasion of Poland
 Battle of Opole – 1241 – First Mongol invasion of Poland
 Battle of Legnica – 1241 – First Mongol invasion of Poland
 Sack of Sandomierz (1260) – 1259 – 1260 – Second Mongol invasion of Poland
 Teutonic takeover of Danzig (Gdańsk) – 1308 – Polish–Teutonic War
 Raid on Brandenburg – 1326 – Polish–Teutonic War (1326–1332)
 Battle of Pyzdry (1331) – 1331 – Polish–Teutonic War (1326–1332)
 Battle of Płowce – 1331 – Polish–Teutonic War (1326–1332)
 Battle of Grunwald – 1410 – Polish–Lithuanian–Teutonic War
 Siege of Marienburg (1410) – 1410 – Polish–Lithuanian–Teutonic War
 Battle of Koronowo – 1410 – Polish–Lithuanian–Teutonic War
 Battle of Grotniki – 1439 – Hussite Wars
 Siege of Malbork (1454) – 1454 – Thirteen Years' War (1454–1466) (Polish–Teutonic War)
 Battle of Chojnice (1454) – 1454 – Thirteen Years' War (1454–1466) (Polish–Teutonic War)
 Battle of Eylau (1455) – 1455 – Thirteen Years' War (1454–1466) (Polish–Teutonic War)
 Battle of Ryn – 1456 – Thirteen Years' War (1454–1466) (Polish–Teutonic War)
 Battle of Sępopol – 1457 – Thirteen Years' War (1454–1466) (Polish–Teutonic War)
 Siege of Marienburg (1457) – 1457 – 1460 – Thirteen Years' War (1454–1466) (Polish–Teutonic War)
 Battle of Pruszcz Gdański – 1460 – Thirteen Years' War (1454–1466) (Polish–Teutonic War)
 Battle of Świecino – 1462 – Thirteen Years' War (1454–1466) (Polish–Teutonic War)
 Battle of Vistula Lagoon – 1463 – Thirteen Years' War (1454–1466) (Polish–Teutonic War)
 Battle of the Cosmin Forest – 1497
 Siege of Allenstein – 1521 – Polish–Teutonic War (1519–1521)
 Battle of Lubieszów – 1577 – Danzig rebellion
 Siege of Danzig (1577) – 1577 – Danzig rebellion
 Battle of Gniew – 1626 – Polish–Swedish War (1626–1629) (Polish–Swedish wars)
 Battle of Czarne – 1627 – Polish–Swedish War (1626–1629) (Polish–Swedish wars)
 Battle of Dirschau – 1627 – Polish–Swedish War (1626–1629) (Polish–Swedish wars)
 Battle of Oliwa – 1627 – Polish–Swedish War (1626–1629) (Polish–Swedish wars)
 Battle of Górzno – 1629 – Polish–Swedish War (1626–1629) (Polish–Swedish wars)
 Battle of Trzciana – 1629 – Polish–Swedish War (1626–1629) (Polish–Swedish wars)
 Battle of Ujście – 1655 – Deluge (history) and Second Northern War (Northern Wars)
 Siege of Danzig (1655–1660) – 1655 – 1660 – Deluge (history) and Second Northern War (Northern Wars)
 Battle of Sobota – 1655 – Deluge (history) and Second Northern War (Northern Wars)
 Battle of Żarnów – 1655 – Deluge (history) and Second Northern War (Northern Wars)
 Siege of Kraków – 1655 – Deluge (history) and Second Northern War (Northern Wars)
 Battle of Nowy Dwór Mazowiecki – 1655 – Deluge (history) and Second Northern War (Northern Wars)
 Battle of Wojnicz – 1655 – Deluge (history) and Second Northern War (Northern Wars)
 Siege of Jasna Góra – 1655 – Deluge (history) and Second Northern War (Northern Wars)
 Battle of Krosno – 1655 – Deluge (history) and Second Northern War (Northern Wars)
 Battle of Radom (1656) – 1656 – Deluge (history) and Second Northern War (Northern Wars)
 Battle of Gołąb – 1656 – Deluge (history) and Second Northern War (Northern Wars)
 Siege of Zamość – 1656 – Deluge (history) and Second Northern War (Northern Wars)
 Battle of Jarosław (1656) – 1656 – Deluge (history) and Second Northern War (Northern Wars)
 Battle of Sandomierz – 1656 – Deluge (history) and Second Northern War (Northern Wars)
 Battle of Nisko – 1656 – Deluge (history) and Second Northern War (Northern Wars)
 Battle of Warka – 1656 – Deluge (history) and Second Northern War (Northern Wars)
 Siege of Warsaw (1656) – 1656 – Deluge (history) and Second Northern War (Northern Wars)
 Battle of Kłecko – 1656 – Deluge (history) and Second Northern War (Northern Wars)
 Battle of Kcynia – 1656 – Deluge (history) and Second Northern War (Northern Wars)
 Battle of Tykocin – 1656 – Deluge (history) and Second Northern War (Northern Wars)
 Battle of Warsaw (1656) – 1656 – Deluge (history) and Second Northern War (Northern Wars)
 Battle of Łowicz – 1656 – Deluge (history) and Second Northern War (Northern Wars)
 Battle of Lubrze – 1656 – Deluge (history) and Second Northern War (Northern Wars)
 Battle of Prostki – 1656 – Deluge (history) and Second Northern War (Northern Wars)
 Battle of Filipów – 1656 – Deluge (history) and Second Northern War (Northern Wars)
 Battle of Chojnice (1656) – 1656 or 1657 – Deluge (history) and Second Northern War (Northern Wars)
 Siege of Kraków (1657) – 1657 – Deluge (history) and Second Northern War (Northern Wars)
 Siege of Toruń (1658) – 1658 – Deluge (history) and Second Northern War (Northern Wars)
 Battle of Grudziądz (1659) – 1659 – Deluge (history) and Second Northern War (Northern Wars)
 Battle of Krasnobród (1672) – 1672 – Polish–Ottoman War (1672–1676) (Polish–Ottoman Wars)
 Battle of Kliszów – 1702 – Swedish invasion of Poland (1701–1706) (Great Northern War) [Northern Wars]
 Battle of Pułtusk (1703) – 1703 – Swedish invasion of Poland (1701–1706) (Great Northern War) [Northern Wars]
 Siege of Thorn (1703) – 1703 – Swedish invasion of Poland (1701–1706) (Great Northern War) [Northern Wars]
 Battle of Poznań (1704) – 1704 – Swedish invasion of Poland (1701–1706) (Great Northern War) [Northern Wars]
 Battle of Poniec – 1704 – Swedish invasion of Poland (1701–1706) (Great Northern War) [Northern Wars]
 Battle of Warsaw (1705) – 1705 – Swedish invasion of Poland (1701–1706) (Great Northern War) [Northern Wars]
 Battle of Praga (1705) – 1705 – Swedish invasion of Poland (1701–1706) (Great Northern War) [Northern Wars]
 Battle of Fraustadt – 1706 – Swedish invasion of Poland (1701–1706) (Great Northern War) [Northern Wars]
 Battle of Kalisz – 1706 – Swedish invasion of Poland (1701–1706) (Great Northern War) [Northern Wars]
 Battle of Koniecpol – 1708 – Swedish invasion of Russia (Great Northern War) [Northern Wars]
 Siege of Danzig (1734) – 1734 – War of the Polish Succession
 Battle of Mollwitz – 1741 – First Silesian War (War of the Austrian Succession and Silesian Wars)
 Battle of Hohenfriedberg – 1745 – Second Silesian War (War of the Austrian Succession and Silesian Wars)
 Battle of Hennersdorf – 1745 – Second Silesian War (War of the Austrian Succession and Silesian Wars)
 Battle of Moys – 1757 – Third Silesian War (Seven Years' War)
 Battle of Breslau (1757) – 1757 – Third Silesian War (Seven Years' War)
 Battle of Leuthen – 1757 – Third Silesian War (Seven Years' War)
 Siege of Breslau (1757) – 1757 – Third Silesian War (Seven Years' War)
 Siege of Küstrin – 1758 – Seven Years' War
 Battle of Zorndorf – 1758 – Third Silesian War (Seven Years' War)
 Battle of Kay – 1759 – Seven Years' War
 Battle of Frisches Haff – 1759 – Pomeranian War (Seven Years' War)
 Battle of Kunersdorf – 1759 – Third Silesian War (Seven Years' War)
 Battle of Neustadt (1760) – 1760 – Third Silesian War (Seven Years' War)
 Siege of Glatz – 1760 – Third Silesian War (Seven Years' War)
 Battle of Landeshut (1760) – 1760 – Third Silesian War (Seven Years' War)
 Battle of Liegnitz (1760) – 1760 – Third Silesian War (Seven Years' War)
 Battle of Burkersdorf (1762) – 1762 – Third Silesian War (Seven Years' War)
 Siege of Schweidnitz (1762) – 1762 – Third Silesian War (Seven Years' War)
 First battle of Lanckorona – 1771 – Bar Confederation
 Second Battle of Lanckorona – 1771 – Bar Confederation
 Battle of Dubienka – 1792 – Polish–Russian War of 1792
 Battle of Racławice – 1794 – Kościuszko Uprising
 Warsaw Uprising (1794) – 1794 – Kościuszko Uprising
 Battle of Szczekociny – 1794 – Kościuszko Uprising
 Battle of Chełm – 1794 – Kościuszko Uprising
 Battle of Rajgród (1794) – 1794 – Kościuszko Uprising
 Siege of Warsaw (1794) – 1794 – Kościuszko Uprising
 Battle of Maciejowice – 1794 – Kościuszko Uprising
 Battle of Praga – 1794 – Kościuszko Uprising
 Battle of Czarnowo – 1806 – War of the Fourth Coalition (Napoleonic Wars)
 Battle of Golymin – 1806 – War of the Fourth Coalition (Napoleonic Wars)
 Battle of Pułtusk (1806) – 1806 – War of the Fourth Coalition (Napoleonic Wars)
 Siege of Graudenz – 1807 – War of the Fourth Coalition (Napoleonic Wars)
 Battle of Mohrungen – 1807 – War of the Fourth Coalition (Napoleonic Wars)
 Battle of Allenstein – 1807 – War of the Fourth Coalition (Napoleonic Wars)
 Battle of Ostrołęka (1807) – 1807 – War of the Fourth Coalition (Napoleonic Wars)
 Siege of Danzig (1807) – 1807 – War of the Fourth Coalition (Napoleonic Wars)
 Siege of Kolberg (1807) – 1807 – War of the Fourth Coalition (Napoleonic Wars)
 Battle of Guttstadt-Deppen – 1807 – War of the Fourth Coalition (Napoleonic Wars)
 Battle of Heilsberg – 1807 – War of the Fourth Coalition (Napoleonic Wars)
 Battle of Raszyn (1809) – 1809 – Austro-Polish War (War of the Fifth Coalition) [Napoleonic Wars]
 Battle of Radzymin (1809) – 1809 – Austro-Polish War (War of the Fifth Coalition) [Napoleonic Wars]
 Battle of Kock (1809) – 1809
 Siege of Danzig (1813) – 1813 – German campaign of 1813 (War of the Sixth Coalition) [Napoleonic Wars]
 Battle of Haynau – 1813 – German campaign of 1813 (War of the Sixth Coalition) [Napoleonic Wars]
 Battle of the Katzbach – 1813 – German campaign of 1813 (War of the Sixth Coalition) [Napoleonic Wars]
 Battle of Stoczek – 1831 – November Uprising
 First Battle of Wawer – 1831 – November Uprising
 Battle of Nowa Wieś (1831) – 1831 – November Uprising
 Battle of Białołęka – 1831 – November Uprising
 Battle of Olszynka Grochowska – 1831 – November Uprising
 Second Battle of Wawer – 1831 – November Uprising
 Battle of Dębe Wielkie – 1831 – November Uprising
 Battle of Iganie – 1831 – November Uprising
 Battle of Ostrołęka (1831) – 1831 – November Uprising
 Battle of Rajgród – 1831 – November Uprising
 Battle of Warsaw (1831) – 1831 – November Uprising
 Battle of Kock (1944) – fought during Operation Tempest: World War II
 Battle of Nasielsk – 1920
 Battle of Tannenberg – 1914
 Battle of the Vistula River – 1914 – during World War I
 Battle of Warsaw (1920) – during the Polish–Soviet War
 Siege of Warsaw (1939) – at the outset of World War II
 Warsaw Uprising – near the end of World War II

Portugal
 Battle of Pedroso – 1071
 Battle of São Mamede – 1128
 Battle of Ourique – 1139 – Reconquista
 Siege of Lisbon (1142) – 1142 – Reconquista
 Conquest of Santarém – 1147 – Reconquista
 Siege of Lisbon – 1147 – Reconquista and Second Crusade (Crusades)
 Siege of Santarém (1184) – 1184 – Reconquista
 Alvor massacre – 1189 – Reconquista and Third Crusade (Crusades)
 Siege of Silves (1189) – 1189 – Reconquista and Third Crusade (Crusades)
 Siege of Faro (1249) – 1249 – Reconquista
 Battle of Atoleiros – 1384 – 1383–1385 Portuguese interregnum (Hundred Years' War)
 Siege of Lisbon (1384) – 1384 – 1383–1385 Portuguese interregnum (Hundred Years' War)
 Battle of Leça – 1384 – 1383–1385 Portuguese interregnum (Hundred Years' War)
 Naval Battle of the Tejo – 1384 – 1383–1385 Portuguese interregnum (Hundred Years' War)
 Battle of Trancoso – 1385 – 1383–1385 Portuguese interregnum (Hundred Years' War)
 Battle of Aljubarrota – 1385 – 1383–1385 Portuguese interregnum (Hundred Years' War)
 Battle of Alfarrobeira – 1449
 Battle of Alcântara (1580) – 1580 – War of the Portuguese Succession
 Capture of Porto – 1580 – War of the Portuguese Succession
 Battle of Salga – 1581 – War of the Portuguese Succession
 Battle of Vila Franca do Campo or Battle of Ponta Delgada or Naval Battle of Isla Terceira – 1582 – War of the Portuguese Succession, Anglo-Spanish War and Eighty Years' War, 1579–1588 (Eighty Years' War) [European wars of religion]
 Conquest of the Azores – 1583 – War of the Portuguese Succession and Anglo-Spanish War
 Battle of the Berlengas (1591) – 1591 – Anglo-Spanish War (1585–1604)
 Battle of Flores (1591) – 1591 – Anglo-Spanish War (1585–1604)
 Battle of Flores (1592) – 1592 – Anglo-Spanish War (1585–1604)
 Action of Faial – 1594 – Anglo-Spanish War (1585–1604)
 Battle of Sesimbra Bay – 1602 – Anglo-Spanish War (1585–1604)
 Battle of the Gulf of Cadiz (1604) – 1604 – Anglo-Spanish War (1585–1604)
 Battle of Cape St. Vincent (1606) – 1606 – Eighty Years' War, 1599–1609 and Dutch–Portuguese War (Eighty Years' War) [European wars of religion]
 Sack of Madeira – 1617 – Ottoman–Portuguese confrontations
 Siege of São Filipe – 1641 – 1642 – Portuguese Restoration War
 Battle of Cape St. Vincent (1641) – 1641 – Eighty Years' War, 1621–1648 (Eighty Years' War and Thirty Years' War) [European wars of religion]
 Battle of Arronches – 1653 – Portuguese Restoration War
 Battle of Vilanova – 1658 – Portuguese Restoration War
 Battle of the Lines of Elvas – 1659 – Portuguese Restoration War
 Battle of Ameixial – 1663 – Portuguese Restoration War
 Battle of Castelo Rodrigo – 1664 – Portuguese Restoration War
 Battle of Montes Claros – 1665 – Portuguese Restoration War
 Battle of the Berlengas (1666) – 1666 – Portuguese Restoration War
 Battle of Lagos (1693) – 1693 – Nine Years' War
 Battle of Cap de la Roque – 1703 – War of the Spanish Succession
 Battle of La Gudiña – 1709 – War of the Spanish Succession
 Battle of Cape St. Vincent (1719) – 1719 – War of the Quadruple Alliance
 Action of 18 March 1748 – 1748 – War of Jenkins' Ear (War of the Austrian Succession)
 Battle of Lagos – 1759 – Planned French invasion of Britain (1759) (Seven Years' War)
 Siege of Almeida (1762) – 1762 – Spanish invasion of Portugal (1762) (Fantastic War) [Seven Years' War]
 Battle of Vila Velha – 1762 – Spanish invasion of Portugal (1762) (Fantastic War) [Seven Years' War]
 Battle of Marvão – 1762 – Spanish invasion of Portugal (1762) (Fantastic War) [Seven Years' War]
 Action of 14 September 1779 – 1779 – American Revolutionary War
 Action of 11 November 1779 – 1779 – American Revolutionary War
 Action of 20 November 1779 – 1779 – American Revolutionary War
 Battle of Cape St. Vincent (1780) – 1780 – American Revolutionary War
 Action of 24 February 1780 – 1780 – American Revolutionary War
 Action of 9 August 1780 – 1780 – American Revolutionary War
 Action of 30 May 1781 – 1781 – Fourth Anglo-Dutch War (American Revolutionary War)
 Battle of the Levant Convoy – 1795 – War of the First Coalition (French Revolutionary Wars)
 Battle of Cape St. Vincent (1797) – 1797 – Anglo-Spanish War (1796–1808) (French Revolutionary and Napoleonic Wars)
 Action of 5 October 1804 – 1804 – Anglo-Spanish War (1796–1808) (French Revolutionary and Napoleonic Wars)
 Action of 7 December 1804 – 1804 – Anglo-Spanish War (1796–1808) (French Revolutionary and Napoleonic Wars)
 Combat of Padrões de Teixeira – 1808 – Peninsular War
 Battle of Évora (1808) – 1808 – Peninsular War
 Battle of Roliça – 1808 – Peninsular War
 Battle of Vimeiro – 1808 – Peninsular War
 Siege of Chaves – 1809 – Peninsular War
 Battle of Braga (1809) – 1809 – Peninsular War
 First Battle of Porto – 1809 – Peninsular War
 Battle of Grijó – 1809 – Peninsular War
 Second Battle of Porto – 1809 – Peninsular War
 Combat of the Côa – 1810 – Peninsular War
 Siege of Almeida – 1810 – Peninsular War
 Battle of Bussaco – 1810 – Peninsular War
 Trant's raid – 1810 – Peninsular War
 Battle of Sobral – 1810 – Peninsular War
 Battle of Pombal – 1811 – Peninsular War
 Battle of Redinha – 1811 – Peninsular War
 Battle of Casal Novo – 1811 – Peninsular War
 Battle of Foz de Arouce – 1811 – Peninsular War
 Battle of Campo Maior – 1811 – Peninsular War
 Battle of Sabugal – 1811 – Peninsular War
 Blockade of Almeida – 1811 – Peninsular War
 Battle of Praia da Vitória – 1829 – Liberal Wars
 Battle of the Tagus – 1831 – Liberal Wars
 Battle of Ladeira da Velha – 1831 – Liberal Wars
 Landing at Mindelo – 1832 – Liberal Wars
 Battle of Ponte Ferreira – 1832 – Liberal Wars
 Siege of Porto – 1832 – 1833 – Liberal Wars
 Battle of Cape St. Vincent (1833) – 1833 – Liberal Wars
 Battle of Cova da Piedade – 1833 – Liberal Wars
 Battle of Asseiceira – 1834 – Liberal Wars

Qatar 

 Battle of Khakeekera – 1811

Romania
 Battle of Tapae – 87 – Domitian's Dacian War
 Second Battle of Tapae – 101 – Trajan's Dacian Wars
 Battle of Adamclisi – 101-102 – Trajan's Dacian Wars
 Battle of Gatae – 103 – Trajan's Dacian Wars
 Battle of Sarmisegetusa – 106 – Trajan's Dacian Wars
 Battle of Noviodunum – 369 – Roman–Germanic wars
 Battle of Ongal – 680 – Byzantine–Bulgarian wars
 Battle of Kerlés or Battle of Chiraleș or Battle of Cserhalom – 1068
 Battle of Posada – 1330 – Hungarian-Wallachian War
 Battle of Karanovasa – 1394 – Ottoman wars in Europe
 Battle of Rovine – 1395 – Ottoman wars in Europe
 Battle of Hermannstadt – 1442 – Ottoman–Hungarian wars
 Night Attack at Târgovişte – 1462
 Battle of Baia – 1467 – Hungarian–Moldavian Wars
 Battle of Vaslui – 1475 – Moldavian–Ottoman Wars and Ottoman–Hungarian wars (Ottoman wars in Europe)
 Battle of Valea Albă or Battle of Războieni or Battle of Akdere – 1476 – Moldavian–Ottoman Wars (Ottoman wars in Europe)
 Siege of Neamț Citadel – 1476 – Moldavian–Ottoman Wars (Ottoman wars in Europe)
 Battle of Breadfield – 1479 – Ottoman–Hungarian wars and Serbian-Ottoman wars (Ottoman wars in Europe)
 Battle of Szőlős – 1527 – Hungarian campaign of 1527–1528 (Ottoman–Habsburg wars)
 Battle of Călugăreni – 1595 – Long Turkish War (Ottoman–Habsburg wars)
 Battle of Giurgiu – 1595 – Long Turkish War (Ottoman–Habsburg wars)
 Battle of Șelimbăr – 1599 – Long Turkish War (Ottoman–Habsburg wars)
 Battle of Mirăslău – 1600 – Long Turkish War (Ottoman–Habsburg wars)
 Battle of Guruslău – 1601 – Long Turkish War (Ottoman–Habsburg wars)
 Battle of Brașov – 1603 – Long Turkish War (Ottoman–Habsburg wars)
 Battle of Cecora (1620) – 1620 – Polish–Ottoman War (1620–1621) (Polish–Ottoman Wars)
 Battle of Finta – 1653
 Battle of Zernest – 1690 – Great Turkish War
 Battle of Lugos – 1695 – Great Turkish War
 Battle of Olasch – 1696 – Great Turkish War
 Battle of Cenei – 1696 – Great Turkish War
 Battle of Zsibó – 1705 – Rákóczi's War of Independence (War of the Spanish Succession)
 Battle of Larga – Russo-Turkish War (1768–1774)
 Battle of Karánsebes – 1788 – Austro-Turkish War (1788–91)
 Battle of Focșani – 1789 – Russo-Turkish War (1787–1792)
 Battle of Rymnik – 1789 – Russo-Turkish War (1787–1792)
 Battle of Măcin – 1791 – Russo-Turkish War (1787–1792)
 Battle of Slobozia – 1811 – Russo-Turkish War (1806–1812)
 Battle of Dragashani – 1821 – Greek War of Independence
 Battle of Segesvár – 1849 – Hungarian Revolution of 1848
 Battle of Temesvár – 1849 – Hungarian Revolution of 1848
 Battle of Oltenița – 1853 – Crimean War
 Battle of Cetate – 1853–1854 – Crimean War
 World War I
 Battle of Transylvania – 1916
 Battle of Turtucaia – 1916
 First Battle of Cobadin – 1916
 Flămânda Offensive – 1916 
 Second Battle of Cobadin – 1916
 Battle of Bucharest – 1916
 Prunaru Charge
 Battle of the Argeș
 First Battle of Oituz – 1916
 Second Battle of Oituz – 1916
 Battle of Mărăști – 1917
 Third Battle of Oituz – 1917
 Battle of Mărășești – 1917
 World War II
 Uman–Botoșani Offensive – 1944
 First Jassy–Kishinev Offensive – 1944
 First Battle of Târgu Frumos – 1944
 Battle of Podu Iloaiei – 1944
 Second Battle of Târgu Frumos – 1944
 Second Jassy–Kishinev Offensive – 1944
 Battle of Turda – 1944
 Battle of Păuliș – 1944

Russia
 Battle of the River Thatis – 310 BC or 309 BC – Bosporan Civil War
 Siege of Siracena – 309 BC – Bosporan Civil War
 Battle of the Tanais River – 373
 Battle of Voronezh River – 1237 – Mongol invasion of Kievan Rus'
 Siege of Ryazan – 1237 – Mongol invasion of Kievan Rus'
 Siege of Kolomna – 1237 – 1238 – Mongol invasion of Kievan Rus'
 Siege of Moscow (1238) – 1238 – Mongol invasion of Kievan Rus'
 Siege of Vladimir – 1238 – Mongol invasion of Kievan Rus'
 Battle of the Sit River – 1238 – Mongol invasion of Kievan Rus'
 Siege of Kozelsk – 1238 – Mongol invasion of Kievan Rus'
 Battle of the Neva – 1240 – Swedish–Novgorodian Wars
 Battle on the Ice – 1242 – Livonian campaign against Rus' and Northern Crusades (Crusades)
 Battle of Rudau – 1370 – Lithuanian Crusade (Northern Crusades) [Crusades]
 Battle on Pyana River – 1377 – Conflicts in Eastern Europe during Turco-Mongol rule
 Battle of the Vozha River – 1378 – Conflicts in Eastern Europe during Turco-Mongol rule
 Battle of Kulikovo – 1380 – Conflicts in Eastern Europe during Turco-Mongol rule
 Siege of Moscow (1382) – Conflicts in Eastern Europe during Turco-Mongol rule
 Battle of the Kondurcha River – 1391 – Tokhtamysh–Timur war (Timurid conquests and invasions)
 Battle of the Terek River – 1395 – Tokhtamysh–Timur war (Timurid conquests and invasions)
 Battle of Belyov – 1437 – Conflicts in Eastern Europe during Turco-Mongol rule
 Battle of Suzdal – 1445 – Conflicts in Eastern Europe during Turco-Mongol rule, Muscovite Civil War and Russo-Kazan Wars
 Siege of Kazan (1487) – 1487 – Russo-Kazan Wars
 Battle of Vedrosha – 1500 – Muscovite–Lithuanian Wars
 Battle of the Siritsa River – 1501 – Muscovite–Lithuanian Wars
 Siege of Smolensk (1502) – 1502 – Muscovite–Lithuanian Wars
 Siege of Smolensk (1514) – 1514 – Muscovite–Lithuanian Wars
 Siege of Opochka – 1517 – Muscovite–Lithuanian Wars
 Siege of Kazan – 1552 – Russo-Kazan Wars
 Battle of Kivinebb – 1555 – Russo-Swedish War (1554–1557) (Russo-Swedish Wars)
 Battle of Nevel – 1562 – Livonian War (Polish-Russian Wars, Polish–Swedish wars and Russo-Swedish Wars)
 Battle of Molodi – 1572 – Russo-Crimean Wars
 Siege of Velikiye Luki – 1580 – Livonian War (Polish-Russian Wars, Polish–Swedish wars and Russo-Swedish Wars)
 Battle of Toropets (1580) – 1580 – Livonian War (Polish-Russian Wars, Polish–Swedish wars and Russo-Swedish Wars)
 Siege of Pskov – 1581 – 1582 – Livonian War (Polish-Russian Wars, Polish–Swedish wars and Russo-Swedish Wars)
 Battle of Torches – 1583 – Ottoman–Safavid War (1578–1590) (Ottoman–Persian Wars)
 Battle of Dobrynichi – 1605 – Time of Troubles (False Dmitry I)
 Siege of Kromy – 1605 – Time of Troubles (False Dmitry I)
 Siege of Moscow (1606) – 1606 – Uprising of Bolotnikov (Time of Troubles)
 Battle of Kozelsk – 1607 – Time of Troubles (False Dmitry II)
 Battle of Zaraysk – 1608 – Time of Troubles (False Dmitry II)
 Battle of Bolkhov – 1608 – Time of Troubles (False Dmitry II)
 Battle of Medvezhiy Brod – 1608 – Time of Troubles (False Dmitry II)
 Siege of Troitsky monastery – 1608 – 1610 – Time of Troubles (False Dmitry II)
 Siege of Smolensk (1609–1611) – 1609 – 1611 – Polish–Muscovite War (1609–1618)
 Siege of Tsaryovo-Zaymishche – 1610 – Polish–Muscovite War (1609–1618)
 Battle of Klushino or Battle of Kłuszyn – 1610 – Polish–Muscovite War (1609–1618)
 Capture of Novgorod (1611) – 1611 – Ingrian War
 Battle of Moscow (1612) – 1612 – Polish–Muscovite War (1609–1618)
 Siege of Tikhvin – 1613 – Ingrian War
 Siege of Smolensk (1613–1617) – 1613 – 1617 – Polish–Muscovite War (1609–1618)
 Battle of Bronnitsy – 1614 – Ingrian War
 Siege of Gdov – 1614 – Ingrian War
 Siege of Pskov (1615) – 1615 – Ingrian War
 Battle of Mozhaysk – 1618 – Polish–Muscovite War (1609–1618)
 Siege of Moscow (1618) – 1618 – Polish–Muscovite War (1609–1618)
 Siege of Dorogobuzh – 1632 – Smolensk War
 Siege of Smolensk (1632–1633) – 1632 – 1633 – Smolensk War
 Siege of Belaya – 1634 – Smolensk War
 Siege of Smolensk (1654) – 1654 – Russo-Polish War (1654–1667) (Polish-Russian Wars)
 Siege of Nyenschantz (1656) – 1656 – Russo-Swedish War (1656–1658) (Second Northern War) [Northern Wars]
 Battle of Gdov – 1657 – Russo-Swedish War (1656–1658) (Second Northern War) [Northern Wars]
 First siege of Albazin – 1685 – Sino-Russian border conflicts
 Second siege of Albazin – 1686 – Sino-Russian border conflicts
 Siege of Nöteborg (1702) – 1702 – Great Northern War (Northern Wars)
 Battle of Systerbäck – 1703 – Great Northern War (Northern Wars)
 Battle of the Neva (1708) – 1708 – Swedish invasion of Russia (Great Northern War) [Northern Wars]
 Battle of Rajovka – 1708 – Swedish invasion of Russia (Great Northern War) [Northern Wars]
 Battle of Koporye – 1708 – Great Northern War (Northern Wars)
 Evacuation of Kolkanpää – 1708 – Great Northern War (Northern Wars)
 Siege of Viborg (1710) – 1710 – Great Northern War (Northern Wars)
 Battle of Gross-Jägersdorf – 1757 – Seven Years' War
 Battle of Beshtamak – 1774 – Russo-Circassian War
 Battle of Kazan (1774) – 1774 – Pugachev's Rebellion
 Battle of Tsaritsyn (1774) – 1774 – Pugachev's Rebellion
 Battle of the Sunja – 1785 – Russo-Circassian War and Chechen–Russian conflict
 Battle of Jilehoy – 1787 – Russo-Circassian War
 Battle of Hogland – 1788 – Russo-Swedish War (1788–1790)
 Battle of Kronstadt – 1790 – Russo-Swedish War (1788–1790)
 Battle of Uransari – 1790 – Russo-Swedish War (1788–1790)
 Battle of Björkösund – 1790 – Russo-Swedish War (1788–1790)
 Battle of Vyborg Bay (1790) – 1790 – Russo-Swedish War (1788–1790)
 Siege of Anapa (1791) – 1791 – Russo-Circassian War and Russo-Turkish War (1787–1792)
 Battle of Eylau – 1807 – War of the Fourth Coalition (Napoleonic Wars)
 Battle of Khankala (1807) – 1807 – Russo-Circassian War
 Battle of Friedland – 1807 – War of the Fourth Coalition (Napoleonic Wars)
 Battle of Pälkjärvi – 1808 – Finnish War (Napoleonic Wars)
 Battle of Inkovo – 1812 – French invasion of Russia (Napoleonic Wars)
 First Battle of Krasnoi – 1812 – French invasion of Russia (Napoleonic Wars)
 Battle of Smolensk (1812) – 1812 – French invasion of Russia (Napoleonic Wars)
 Battle of Valutino – 1812 – French invasion of Russia (Napoleonic Wars)
 Battle of Shevardino – 1812 – French invasion of Russia (Napoleonic Wars)
 Battle of Borodino – 1812 – French invasion of Russia (Napoleonic Wars)
 Battle of Tarutino – 1812 – French invasion of Russia (Napoleonic Wars)
 Battle of Maloyaroslavets – 1812 – French invasion of Russia (Napoleonic Wars)
 Battle of Vyazma – 1812 – French invasion of Russia (Napoleonic Wars)
 Battle of Liaskowa – 1812 – French invasion of Russia (Napoleonic Wars)
 Battle of Krasnoi – 1812 – French invasion of Russia (Napoleonic Wars)
 Battle of Dadi-yurt – 1819 – Russo-Circassian War
 Battle of Khunzakh – 1830 – Russo-Circassian War
 Battle of Gimry – 1832 – Russo-Circassian War
 Battle of Argvani – 1839 – Russo-Circassian War
 Siege of Akhoulgo – 1839 – Russo-Circassian War
 Siege of Lazarevsky – 1840 – Russo-Circassian War
 Battle of the Valerik River – 1840 – Russo-Circassian War
 Battle of Ichkeria – 1842 – Russo-Circassian War
 Battle of Dargo (1845) – 1845 – Russo-Circassian War
 Battle of Gordali (1852) – 1852 – Russo-Circassian War
 Battle of Ghunib – 1859 – Russo-Circassian War
 Battle of Qbaada – 1864 – Russo-Circassian War
 Battle of Lake Khasan – 1939
 Battle of Moscow – 1941
 Siege of Leningrad – 1941–43
 Battle of Stalingrad – 1942–1943
 Battles of Rzhev – 1942–43
 Battle of Kursk – 1943
 Battle of Prokhorovka – 1943
 Operation Bagration – 1944
 Battle of Grozny (November 1994)
 Battle of Dolinskoye – 1994
 Battle of Khankala (1994)
 Battle of Grozny (1994–1995)
 Battle of Grozny (August 1996)
 Battle of Grozny (1999–2000)
 Battle for Height 776 – 2000
 Battle of Komsomolskoye – 2000
 Battle for Vedeno – 2001

Saint Kitts and Nevis 

 Battle of St. Kitts (1629) – 1629 – Anglo-Spanish War (1625–1630) (Thirty Years' War)
 Battle of Nevis – 1667 – Second Anglo-Dutch War (Anglo-Dutch Wars)
 Siege of Brimstone Hill – 1782 – American Revolutionary War
 Battle of Saint Kitts – 1782 – American Revolutionary War
 USS Constellation vs L'Insurgente – 1799 – Quasi-War (French Revolutionary Wars)
 USS Constellation vs La Vengeance – 1800 – Quasi-War (French Revolutionary Wars)

Saint Lucia 

 Battle of St. Lucia – 1778 – American Revolutionary War
 Capture of St. Lucia – 1778 – American Revolutionary War

Saint Vincent and the Grenadines 

 Capture of Saint Vincent – 1779 – American Revolutionary War

Saudi Arabia
 Battle of Badr – 624 – Muslim–Quraysh War
 Battle of Uhud – 625 – Muslim–Quraysh War
 Battle of Hamra al-Asad – 625 – Muslim–Quraysh War
 Battle of the Trench – 626 – 627 – Muslim–Quraysh War
 Battle of Khaybar – 628 – Military career of Muhammad
 Conquest of Mecca – 629 – 630 – Muslim–Quraysh War
 Battle of Hunayn – 630 – Military career of Muhammad
 Battle of Autas – 630 – Military career of Muhammad
 Siege of Ta'if – 630 – Military career of Muhammad
 Battle of Zhu Qissa – 632 – Ridda Wars
 Battle of Buzakha – 632 – Ridda Wars
 Battle of Ghamra – 632 – Ridda Wars
 Battle of Zafar – 632 – Ridda Wars
 Battle of Yamama – 632 – Ridda Wars
 Battle of Dawmat al-Jandal – 633 – Ridda Wars
 Battle of Naqra – 633 – Ridda Wars
 Battle of al-Harra – 683 – Second Fitna
 Siege of Mecca (683) – 683 – Second Fitna
 Siege of Mecca (692) – 692 – Second Fitna
 Battle of Fakhkh – 786
 Siege of Jeddah – 1517 – Portuguese–Mamluk naval war and Ottoman–Portuguese confrontations
 Siege of Qatif (1551) – 1551 – Ottoman–Portuguese conflicts (1538–1559) (Ottoman–Portuguese confrontations)
 Battle of Yanbu – 1811 – Wahhabi War
 Battle of Al-Safra – 1812 – Wahhabi War
 Battle of Medina (1812) – 1812 – Wahhabi War
 Battle of Jeddah (1813) – 1813 – Wahhabi War
 Battle of Mecca (1813) – 1813 – Wahhabi War
 Siege of Diriyah – 1818 – Wahhabi War
 Battle of Mulayda – September 29, 1890 – Rashidi troops ended the Second Saudi State.
 Battle of Riyadh (1902) – Ibn Saud recaptured Riyadh from Rashidis.
 Battle of Dilam – (1903) – Ibn Saud victory over Rashidis.
 Battle of Bekeriyah (1904) – Ibn Saud victory over Rashidis.
 Battle of Shinanah (1904) – Ibn Saud victory over Rashidis.
 Battle of Rawdat Muhanna (1906) – Ibn Saud victory over Rashidis.
 Battle of Tarafiyah (1907) – Ibn Saud victory over Rashidis.
 Battle of Mecca (1924) – Ibn Saud captured Mecca.
 Battle of Jeddah (1925) – Ibn Saud captured Jeddah and ended the Kingdom of Hejaz.
 Battle of Khafji – (1991) – Saudi, Qatari and American troops successfully regained control over Khafji from Iraqis.

Scotland
 Battle of Mons Graupius – 83 or 84 – Roman conquest of Britain
 Siege of Burnswark – 140 – Roman conquest of Britain
 Battle of Alclud Ford – c. 574 or 580 or 590 – Anglo-Saxon settlement of Britain
 Battle of Raith – 596 – Anglo-Saxon settlement of Britain
 Battle of Degsastan – 603 – Anglo-Saxon settlement of Britain
 Battle of Two Rivers – 671 – Anglo-Saxon settlement of Britain
 Battle of Dun Nechtain – 685 – Anglo-Saxon settlement of Britain
 Battle of Dollar – 865 – Viking invasions of Scotland
 Battle of Carham – 1018
 Battle of Lumphanan – 1057
 Battle of Stracathro – 1130
 Battle of Renfrew – 1164
 Battle of Mam Garvia – 1187
 Battle of Largs – 1263 – Scottish–Norwegian War
 Battle of Red Ford – 1294
 Battle of Dunbar (1296) – 1296 – First War of Scottish Independence
 Action at Lanark – 1297 – First War of Scottish Independence
 Raid on Scone – 1297 – First War of Scottish Independence
 Battle of Stirling Bridge – 1297 – First War of Scottish Independence
 Battle of Falkirk – 1298 – First War of Scottish Independence
 Battle of Roslin – 1303 – First War of Scottish Independence
 Battle of Happrew – 1304 – First War of Scottish Independence
 Sieges of Stirling Castle – 1304 – First War of Scottish Independence
 Action at Earnside – 1304 – First War of Scottish Independence
 Battle of Methven – 1306 – First War of Scottish Independence
 Battle of Dalrigh – 1306 – First War of Scottish Independence
 Battle of Loch Ryan – 1307 – First War of Scottish Independence
 Battle of Turnberry – 1307 – First War of Scottish Independence
 Battle of Glen Trool – 1307 – First War of Scottish Independence
 Battle of Loudoun Hill – 1307 – First War of Scottish Independence
 Battle of Slioch – 1307 – First War of Scottish Independence
 Battle of Inverurie (1308) or Battle of Barra – 1308 – First War of Scottish Independence
 Harrying of Buchan or Rape of Buchan or Herschip – 1308 – First War of Scottish Independence
 Battle of the River Dee – 1308 – First War of Scottish Independence
 Battle of the Pass of Brander – 1308 – First War of Scottish Independence
 Capture of Roxburgh (1314) – 1314 – First War of Scottish Independence
 Battle of Bannockburn – 1314 – First War of Scottish Independence
 Battle of Skaithmuir – 1316 – First War of Scottish Independence
 Battle of Drumlui – 1330 or 1337 – Clan Cameron-Clan Mackintosh feud
 Battle of Kinghorn – 1332 – Second War of Scottish Independence
 Battle of Dupplin Moor – 1332 – Second War of Scottish Independence
 Battle of Annan – 1332 – Second War of Scottish Independence
 Battle of Dornock – 1333 – Second War of Scottish Independence
 Battle of Boroughmuir – 1335 – Second War of Scottish Independence
 Battle of Culblean – 1335 – Second War of Scottish Independence
 Battle of Nesbit Moor (1355) – 1355 – Second War of Scottish Independence
 Battle of Invernahavon – 1370 or 1386 – Clan Cameron-Clan Mackintosh feud
 Battle of Duns – 1372 – Anglo-Scottish Wars
 Battle of the North Inch – 1396 – Clan Cameron-Clan Mackintosh feud
 Battle of Fulhope Law – 1400 – Anglo-Scottish Wars
 Battle of Nesbit Moor (1402) – 1402 – Anglo-Scottish Wars 
 Battle of Dingwall – 1411 – Clan Donald and Stewart royal family wars
 Battle of Harlaw – 1411 – Clan Donald and Stewart royal family wars
 Battle of Harpsdale or Battle of Achardale or Battle of Harpasdal – 1426 – Clan Mackay-Clan Gunn feud
 Battle of Drumnacoub – c. between 1427 and 1433 – Clan Mackay-Clan Sutherland feud
 Siege of Inverness (1429) – 1429 – Clan Donald and Stewart royal family wars
 Battle of Mamsha – 1429 – Clan MacDonald-Clan Fraser of Lovat feuds
 Battle of Palm Sunday – 1429 – Clan Cameron-Clan Mackintosh feud
 Battle of Lochaber – 1429 – Clan Donald and Stewart royal family wars
 Battle of Inverlochy (1431) – 1431 – Clan Donald and Stewart royal family wars
 Battle of Piperdean – 1435 – Anglo-Scottish Wars
 Sandside Chase or The Chase of Sandside or The Chase of Sansett – 1437 – Clan Mackay-Clan Gunn feud
 Siege of Edinburgh Castle – 1440 – Clan Douglas and Stewart royal family feud
 Battle of Craig Cailloch – 1441 – Clan Cameron-Clan Mackintosh feud
 Battle of Arbroath – 1445 or 1446 – Clan Gordon-Clan Lindsay feud
 Battle of Sark – 1448 – Anglo-Scottish Wars
 Battle of Bealach nam Broig – 1299 or more likely 1452 – Clan Munro-Clan Mackenzie feud and Clan Fraser of Lovat-Clan Mackenzie feud
 Battle of Brechin – 1452 – Clan Douglas and Stewart royal family feud and Clan Gordon-Clan Lindsay feud
 Battle of Clachnaharry – 1454 – Clan Munro-Clan Mackintosh feuds
 Battle of Arkinholm – 1455 – Clan Douglas and Stewart royal family feud
 Capture of Roxburgh (1460) – 1460 – Anglo-Scottish Wars
 Battle of Tannach – 1438 or more likely 1464 – Clan Mackay-Clan Gunn feud and Clan Gunn-Clan Keith feud
 Battle of Champions – 1464 or 1478 – Clan Gunn-Clan Keith feud
 Battle of Corpach – c. 1470
 Battle of Lagabraad – 1480 or 1483 – Clan Donald and Stewart royal family wars, Clan MacDonald-Clan Mackenzie feud and Clan MacDonald-Clan Fraser of Lovat feuds
 Battle of Bloody Bay – 1480 or 1483 – Clan Maclean-Clan MacDonald feuds and Clan MacLeod-Clan MacDonald feuds
 Battle of Lochmaben Fair – 1484 – Clan Douglas and Stewart royal family feud
 Battle of Tarbat – 1480s maybe in 1486 – Clan Mackay-Clan Ross feud
 Battle of Aldy Charrish – 1486 or 1487 – Clan Mackay-Clan Ross feud
 Battle of Sauchieburn – 1488 – Clan Cunningham - Clan Montgomery feud
 Sack of Kerelaw Castle – 1488 – Clan Cunningham - Clan Montgomery feud
 Battle of Blar Na Pairce – 1491 – Clan Donald and Stewart royal family wars and Clan MacDonald-Clan Mackenzie feud
 Raid on Ross – 1491 – Clan Donald and Stewart royal family wars and Clan MacDonald-Clan Mackenzie feud
 Battle of Drumchatt (1497) – 1497 – Clan Donald and Stewart royal family wars and Clan MacDonald-Clan Mackenzie feud
 Battle of Drumchatt (1501) – 1501 – Clan Munro-Clan Mackenzie feud
 Siege of Cairnburgh Castle – 1504 – Dubh's Rebellion (Clan Donald and Stewart royal family wars)
 Battle of Achnashellach – 1505 – Dubh's Rebellion (Clan Donald and Stewart royal family wars) and Clan Munro-Clan Cameron feuds
 Battle of Glendale (Skye) – c. 1490 or more likely 1513 – Clan MacLeod-Clan MacDonald feuds
 Battle of Hornshole – 1514 – Anglo-Scottish Wars
 Battle of Torran Dubh or Battle of Torran-dow or Battle of Torran Du – 1517 – Clan Mackay-Clan Sutherland feud or Clan Mackay-Clan Ross feud and Clan Mackay-Clan Gunn feud
 Battle of Alltachuilain – 1518 or 1519 – Clan Mackay-Clan Sutherland feud
 Battle of Melrose – 1526 – Clan Douglas and Stewart royal family feud and Clan Kerr - Clan Scott feud
 Battle of Linlithgow Bridge – 1526 – Clan Douglas and Stewart royal family feud
 Battle of Alltan-Beath – 1542 – Clan Mackay-Clan Sutherland feud
 Battle of Haddon Rig – 1542 – Anglo-Scottish Wars
 Battle of Glasgow (1544) – 1544 – Rough Wooing (Anglo-Scottish Wars
 Burning of Edinburgh – 1544 – Rough Wooing (Anglo-Scottish Wars)
 Battle of the Shirts or Battle of Kinloch-Lochy – 1544 – Clan Cameron-Clan Mackintosh feud, Clan Cameron-Clan Grant feud and Clan MacDonald-Clan Fraser of Lovat feuds
 Battle of Ancrum Moor – 1545 – Rough Wooing (Anglo-Scottish Wars)
 Siege of St Andrews Castle – 1546 – 1547 – Rough Wooing (Anglo-Scottish Wars)
 Battle of Pinkie or Battle of Pinkie Cleugh – 1547 – Rough Wooing (Anglo-Scottish Wars)
 Siege of Broughty Castle – 1547 – 1550 – Rough Wooing (Anglo-Scottish Wars)
 Siege of Haddington – 1548 – 1549 – Rough Wooing (Anglo-Scottish Wars)
 Battle of Garbharry – 1555 – Clan Mackay-Clan Sutherland feud
 Siege of Leith – 1560 – European wars of religion and Anglo-Scottish Wars
 Battle of Corrichie – 1562 – Clan Gordon-Clan Forbes feud
 Battle of Carberry Hill – 1567
 Battle of Langside – 1568 – Marian civil war
 Siege of the Castle Chanonry of Ross – 1569 – 1573 – Marian civil war (European wars of religion), Clan Munro-Clan Mackenzie feud and Clan Munro-Clan Mackintosh feuds
 Battle of Bun Garbhain – 1570 – Clan Cameron-Clan Mackintosh feud
 Battle of Torran-Roy – 1570 – Clan Sutherland - Clan Sinclair feud and Clan Mackay-Clan Sutherland feud
 Battle of Tillieangus – 1571 – Clan Gordon-Clan Forbes feud and Marian civil war
 Battle of Craibstone – 1571 – Clan Gordon-Clan Forbes feud and Marian civil war
 Raid of the Redeswire – 1575 – Anglo-Scottish Wars
 Battle of the Spoiling Dyke – 1578 – Clan MacLeod-Clan MacDonald feuds
 Battle of the Western Isles – 1585 – 1586 – Clan Maclean-Clan MacDonald feuds
 Battle of Allt Camhna – 1586 – Clan Mackay-Clan Gunn feud
 Battle of Leckmelm – 1586 – Clan Mackay-Clan Gunn feud
 Battle of Clynetradwell – 1590 – Clan Sutherland - Clan Sinclair feud and Clan Mackay-Clan Sutherland feud
 Battle of Glenlivet – 1594 – Clan Cameron-Clan Mackintosh feud, Clan Cameron-Clan Grant feud and Clan Gordon-Clan Forbes feud
 Battle of Logiebride – 1597 – Clan Munro-Clan Mackenzie feud and Clan Fraser of Lovat-Clan Mackenzie feud
 Battle of Traigh Ghruinneart – 1598 – Clan Maclean-Clan MacDonald feuds
 Battle of Benbigrie – 1598 – Clan Maclean-Clan MacDonald feuds
 Battle of Carinish – 1601 – Clan MacLeod-Clan MacDonald feuds
 Battle of Coire Na Creiche – 1601 – Clan MacLeod-Clan MacDonald feuds
 Battle of Morar – 1602 – Clan MacDonald-Clan Mackenzie feud
 Battle of Glen Fruin – 1603
 Battle of the Brig of Dee – 1639 – First Bishops' War (Scotland in the Wars of the Three Kingdoms) [Wars of the Three Kingdoms]
 Battle of Tippermuir – 1644 – First English Civil War, 1644 (First English Civil War) [Scotland in the Wars of the Three Kingdoms] [Wars of the Three Kingdoms]
 Battle of Aberdeen (1644) – 1644 – First English Civil War, 1644 (First English Civil War) [Scotland in the Wars of the Three Kingdoms] [Wars of the Three Kingdoms]
 Battle of Inverlochy (1645) – 1645 – Clan MacDonald-Clan Campbell feuds and First English Civil War, 1645 (First English Civil War) [Scotland in the Wars of the Three Kingdoms] [Wars of the Three Kingdoms]
 Battle of Auldearn – 1645 – First English Civil War, 1645 (First English Civil War) [Scotland in the Wars of the Three Kingdoms] [Wars of the Three Kingdoms]
 Battle of Alford – 1645 – First English Civil War, 1645 (First English Civil War) [Scotland in the Wars of the Three Kingdoms] [Wars of the Three Kingdoms]
 Battle of Kilsyth – 1645 – First English Civil War, 1645 (First English Civil War) [Scotland in the Wars of the Three Kingdoms] [Wars of the Three Kingdoms]
 Battle of Philiphaugh – 1645 – First English Civil War, 1645 (First English Civil War) [Scotland in the Wars of the Three Kingdoms] [Wars of the Three Kingdoms]
 Battle of Annan Moor – 1645 – First English Civil War, 1645 (First English Civil War) [Scotland in the Wars of the Three Kingdoms] [Wars of the Three Kingdoms]
 Battle of Aberdeen (1646) – 1646 – First English Civil War, 1646 (First English Civil War) [Scotland in the Wars of the Three Kingdoms] [Wars of the Three Kingdoms]
 Battle of Lagganmore – 1646 – Clan MacDonald-Clan Campbell feuds and First English Civil War, 1646 (First English Civil War) [Scotland in the Wars of the Three Kingdoms] [Wars of the Three Kingdoms]
 Battle of Rhunahaorine Moss – 1647 – Clan MacDonald-Clan Campbell feuds and First English Civil War (Scotland in the Wars of the Three Kingdoms) [Wars of the Three Kingdoms]
 Battle of Castle Sween – 1647 – Clan MacDonald-Clan Campbell feuds
 Battle of Dunaverty – 1647 – Clan MacDonald-Clan Campbell feuds and Second English Civil War (Scotland in the Wars of the Three Kingdoms) [Wars of the Three Kingdoms]
 Battle of Mauchline Muir – 1648 – Second English Civil War (Scotland in the Wars of the Three Kingdoms) [Wars of the Three Kingdoms]
 Whiggamore Raid – 1648 – Anglo-Scottish war (1650–1652) (Scotland in the Wars of the Three Kingdoms) [Wars of the Three Kingdoms]
 Battle of Stirling (1648) – 1648 – Anglo-Scottish war (1650–1652) (Scotland in the Wars of the Three Kingdoms) [Wars of the Three Kingdoms]
 Siege of Inverness (1649) – 1649 – Anglo-Scottish war (1650–1652) (Scotland in the Wars of the Three Kingdoms) [Wars of the Three Kingdoms]
 Siege of Inverness (1650) – 1650 – Anglo-Scottish war (1650–1652) (Scotland in the Wars of the Three Kingdoms) [Wars of the Three Kingdoms]
 Battle of Carbisdale – 1650 – Anglo-Scottish war (1650–1652) (Scotland in the Wars of the Three Kingdoms) [Wars of the Three Kingdoms]
 Battle of Dunbar (1650) – 1650 – Anglo-Scottish war (1650–1652) (Scotland in the Wars of the Three Kingdoms) [Wars of the Three Kingdoms]
 Battle of Hieton – 1650 – Anglo-Scottish war (1650–1652) (Scotland in the Wars of the Three Kingdoms) [Wars of the Three Kingdoms]
 Battle of Inverkeithing – 1651 – Anglo-Scottish war (1650–1652) (Scotland in the Wars of the Three Kingdoms) [Wars of the Three Kingdoms]
 Siege of Dundee – 1651 – Anglo-Scottish war (1650–1652) (Scotland in the Wars of the Three Kingdoms) [Wars of the Three Kingdoms]
 Battle of Tullich – 1654 – Glencairn's rising (Scotland in the Wars of the Three Kingdoms) [Wars of the Three Kingdoms]
 Battle of Dalnaspidal – 1654 – Glencairn's rising (Scotland in the Wars of the Three Kingdoms) [Wars of the Three Kingdoms]
 Battle of Rullion Green – 1666 – Pentland Rising
 Battle of Ronas Voe – 1674 – Third Anglo-Dutch War (Franco-Dutch War and Anglo-Dutch Wars)
 Battle of Drumclog – 1679 – Scottish Covenanter Wars
 Battle of Bothwell Bridge – 1679 – Scottish Covenanter Wars
 Battle of Mulroy – 1688 – Clan Cameron-Clan Mackintosh feud
 Battle of Loup Hill – 1689 – Jacobite rising of 1689 (Jacobite risings)
 Battle of Killiecrankie – 1689 – Jacobite rising of 1689 (Jacobite risings)
 Battle of Dunkeld – 1689 – Jacobite rising of 1689 (Jacobite risings)
 Battle of Cromdale – 1690 – Jacobite rising of 1689 (Jacobite risings)
 Massacre of Glencoe – 1692 – Jacobite rising of 1689 (Jacobite risings)
 Siege of Culloden House (1715) – Jacobite rising of 1715 (Jacobite risings)
 Skirmish of Alness – 1715 – Jacobite rising of 1715 (Jacobite risings) and Clan Munro-Clan Mackenzie feud
 Skirmish of Dunfermline – 1715 – Jacobite rising of 1715 (Jacobite risings)
 Siege of Inverness (1715) – 1715 – Jacobite rising of 1715 (Jacobite risings), Clan Fraser of Lovat-Clan Mackenzie feud, Clan Munro-Clan Mackenzie feud and Clan MacDonald-Clan Fraser of Lovat feuds
 Battle of Sheriffmuir – 1715 – Jacobite rising of 1715 (Jacobite risings)
 Siege of Brahan – 1715 – Jacobite rising of 1715 (Jacobite risings), Clan Munro-Clan Mackenzie feud and Clan Fraser of Lovat-Clan Mackenzie feud
 Capture of Eilean Donan Castle – 1719 – Jacobite rising of 1719 (Jacobite risings and War of the Quadruple Alliance)
 Battle of Glen Shiel – 1719 – Jacobite rising of 1719 (Jacobite risings and War of the Quadruple Alliance), Clan Munro-Clan Cameron feuds, Clan Fraser of Lovat-Clan Mackenzie feud, Clan Munro-Clan Mackintosh feuds and Clan Munro-Clan Mackenzie feud
 Battle of Glen Affric – 1721 – Jacobite rising of 1719 (Jacobite risings and War of the Quadruple Alliance)
 Battle of Coille Bhan – 1721 – Jacobite rising of 1719 (Jacobite risings and War of the Quadruple Alliance)
 Highbridge Skirmish – 1745 – Jacobite rising of 1745 (Jacobite risings)
 Siege of Ruthven Barracks (1745) – 1745 – Jacobite rising of 1745 (Jacobite risings)
 Battle of Prestonpans – 1745 – Jacobite rising of 1745 (Jacobite risings)
 Siege of Culloden House (1745) – 1745 – Jacobite rising of 1745 (Jacobite risings)
 Siege of Fort Augustus (December 1745) – 1745 – Jacobite rising of 1745 (Jacobite risings)
 Battle of Inverurie (1745) – 1745 – Jacobite rising of 1745 (Jacobite risings)
 Battle of Falkirk Muir – 1746 – Jacobite rising of 1745 (Jacobite risings) and Clan Munro-Clan Cameron feuds
 Siege of Stirling Castle (1746) – 1746 – Jacobite rising of 1745 (Jacobite risings)
 Siege of Ruthven Barracks (1746) – 1746 – Jacobite rising of 1745 (Jacobite risings)
 Rout of Moy – 1746 – Jacobite rising of 1745 (Jacobite risings)
 Siege of Inverness (1746) – 1746 – Jacobite rising of 1745 (Jacobite risings)
 Siege of Fort Augustus (March 1746) – 1746 – Jacobite rising of 1745 (Jacobite risings)
 Atholl raids – 1746 – Jacobite rising of 1745 (Jacobite risings)
 Siege of Blair Castle – 1746 – Jacobite rising of 1745 (Jacobite risings)
 Skirmish of Keith – 1746 – Jacobite rising of 1745 (Jacobite risings)
 Siege of Fort William – 1746 – Jacobite rising of 1745 (Jacobite risings)
 Battle of Dornoch – 1746 – Jacobite rising of 1745 (Jacobite risings)
 Skirmish of Tongue – 1746 – Jacobite rising of 1745 (Jacobite risings)
 Battle of Littleferry – 1746 – Jacobite rising of 1745 (Jacobite risings)
 Battle of Culloden – 1746 – Jacobite rising of 1745 (Jacobite risings)
 Skirmish of Loch nan Uamh – 1746 – Jacobite rising of 1745 (Jacobite risings)
 Skirmish of Loch Ailort – 1746 – Jacobite rising of 1745 (Jacobite risings)
 Skirmish of Arisaig – 1746 – Jacobite rising of 1745 (Jacobite risings)
 Raids on Lochaber and Shiramore – 1746 – Jacobite rising of 1745 (Jacobite risings) and Clan Munro-Clan Cameron feuds
 Killin incident of 1749 – 1749 – Aftermath of Jacobite rising of 1745 (Jacobite risings)
 Appin Murder – 1752 – Aftermath of Jacobite rising of 1745 (Jacobite risings)
 Raid on Rannoch – 1753 – Aftermath of Jacobite rising of 1745 (Jacobite risings) and Clan Munro-Clan Cameron feuds

Senegal 

 British capture of Senegal – 1758 – Seven Years' War
 Capture of Gorée – 1758 – Seven Years' War

Serbia
 Battle of Naissus – 268 or 269 – Crisis of the Third Century and Roman–Germanic wars
 Battle of the Margus – 285 – Crisis of the Third Century
 Battle of Bassianae – 468 – Roman–Germanic wars
 Siege of Sirmium – 580 – 582 – Avar–Byzantine wars
 Battles of Viminacium – 599 – Avar–Byzantine wars
 Battle of W.l.n.d.r – 934 – Hungarian invasions of Europe
 Battle of Dubravnica – 1380 or 1381 – Serbian-Ottoman wars (Ottoman wars in Europe)
 Battle of Pločnik – between 1385 – 1387 – Ottoman conquest of Bosnia and Herzegovina and Serbian-Ottoman wars (Ottoman wars in Europe)
 Siege of Golubac – 1428 – Ottoman–Hungarian wars (Ottoman wars in Europe)
 Siege of Belgrade (1440) – 1440 – Serbian-Ottoman wars (Ottoman wars in Europe)
 Battle of Nish (1443) – 1443 – Crusade of Varna (Crusades, Ottoman–Hungarian wars, Polish–Ottoman Wars and Serbian-Ottoman wars)
 Battle of Kunovica – 1444 – Crusade of Varna (Crusades, Ottoman–Hungarian wars, Polish–Ottoman Wars and Serbian-Ottoman wars)
 Battle of Leskovac – 1454 – Serbian-Ottoman wars (Ottoman wars in Europe)
 Battle of Kruševac – 1454 – Ottoman–Hungarian wars and Serbian-Ottoman wars (Ottoman wars in Europe)
 Siege of Belgrade (1456) – 1456 – Ottoman–Hungarian wars and Serbian-Ottoman wars (Ottoman wars in Europe)
 Siege of Belgrade (1521) – 1521 – Ottoman–Hungarian wars (Ottoman wars in Europe)
 Siege of Šabac (1521) – 1521 – Ottoman–Hungarian wars (Ottoman wars in Europe)
 Siege of Belgrade (1688) – 1688 – Great Turkish War, Ottoman–Habsburg wars and Polish–Ottoman Wars
 Battle of Batočina – 1689 – Great Turkish War
 Battle of Niš (1689) – 1689 – Great Turkish War
 Siege of Belgrade (1690) – 1690 – Great Turkish War
 Battle of Slankamen – 1691 – Great Turkish War
 Battle of Olasch – 1696 – Great Turkish War
 Battle of Zenta – 1697 – Great Turkish War
 Battle of Grocka – 1739 – Russo-Turkish War (1735–1739)
 Capture of Belgrade (1739) – 1739 – Russo-Turkish War (1735–1739)
 Siege of Belgrade (1789) – 1789 – Austro-Turkish War (1788–1791)
 Battles of Batočina and Jagodina – 1804 – First Serbian Uprising (Serbian Revolution)
 Battle of Drlupa – 1804 – First Serbian Uprising (Serbian Revolution)
 Battle of Ivankovac – 1805 – First Serbian Uprising (Serbian Revolution)
 Battle of Mišar – 1806 – First Serbian Uprising (Serbian Revolution)
 Siege of Belgrade (1806) – 1806 – First Serbian Uprising (Serbian Revolution)
 Battle of Deligrad – 1806 – First Serbian Uprising (Serbian Revolution)
 Battle of Čegar – 1809 – First Serbian Uprising (Serbian Revolution)
 Battle of Suvodol – 1809 – First Serbian Uprising (Serbian Revolution)
 Battle of Varvarin – 1810 – First Serbian Uprising (Serbian Revolution)
 Battle of Loznica – 1810 – First Serbian Uprising (Serbian Revolution)
 Battle of Cer – 1914
 Battle of Kolubara – 1914
 Battle of Morava – 1915
 Battle of Kosovo (1915) – 1915
 Battle of Ovche Pole – 1915

Seychelles 

 Battle of Mahé – 1801 – French Revolutionary Wars

Slovakia 

 Battle of Trnava (1430) – 1430 – Hussite Wars
 Battle of Ilava or Battle of Rudé Polé – 1431 – Hussite Wars
 Battle of Szina – 1528 – Hungarian campaign of 1527–1528 (Ottoman–Habsburg wars) [Ottoman wars in Europe]
 Battle of Humenné – 1619 – Thirty Years' War
 Battle of Köbölkút – 1663 – Austro-Turkish War (1663–1664) (Ottoman–Habsburg wars) [Ottoman wars in Europe]
 Siege of Érsekújvár (1663) – 1663 – Austro-Turkish War (1663–1664) (Ottoman–Habsburg wars) [Ottoman wars in Europe]
 Siege of Léva – 1664 – Austro-Turkish War (1663–1664) (Ottoman–Habsburg wars) [Ottoman wars in Europe]
 Battle of Párkány – 1683 – Great Turkish War and Polish–Ottoman War (1683–1699)
 Siege of Érsekújvár (1685) – 1685 – Great Turkish War
 Battle of Eperjes – 1685 – Great Turkish War
 Battle of Kassa – 1685 – Great Turkish War
 Battle of Zvolen (1703) – 1703 – Rákóczi's War of Independence (War of the Spanish Succession)
 Battle of Biskupice – 1704 – Rákóczi's War of Independence (War of the Spanish Succession)
 Battle of Smolenice – 1704 – Rákóczi's War of Independence (War of the Spanish Succession)
 Battle of Trenčín – 1708 – Rákóczi's War of Independence (War of the Spanish Succession)

Slovenia
 Battle of the Frigidus – 394 – Roman–Germanic wars
 Battle of Pirano – 1812 – Adriatic campaign of 1807–1814 (Napoleonic Wars)
 Battle of Dražgoše – 1942
 Battle of Osankarica
 Battle of Castle Turjak – 1943
 Battle of Nanos – 1942
 Battle of Trieste
 Battle of Poljana – 1945
 Battle of Caporetto – 1917

South Africa
 Battle of Saldanha Bay (1781) – 1781 – Fourth Anglo-Dutch War (American Revolutionary War)
 Battle of Muizenberg – 1795 – French Revolutionary Wars
 Capitulation of Saldanha Bay – 1796 – French Revolutionary Wars
 Action of 9 February 1799 (South Africa) – 1799 – French Revolutionary Wars
 Battle of Blaauwberg – 1806 – War of the Third Coalition (Napoleonic Wars)
 Battle of Gqokli Hill – 1818 – Ndwandwe–Zulu War
 Battle of Amalinde – 1818 – Xhosa Wars
 Battle of Grahamstown – 1819 – Xhosa Wars
 Battle of Mhlatuze River – 1819 or 1820 – Ndwandwe–Zulu War
 Battle of Blood River – 1838 – Great Trek
 Battle of Magango – 1840
 Battle of Isandlwana – 1879 – Anglo-Zulu War
 Battle of Rorke's Drift – 1879 – Anglo-Zulu War
 Battle of Intombe – 1879 – Anglo-Zulu War
 Battle of Hlobane – 1879 – Anglo-Zulu War
 Battle of Kambula – 1879 – Anglo-Zulu War
 Battle of Gingindlovu – 1879 – Anglo-Zulu War
 Siege of Eshowe – 1879 – Anglo-Zulu War
 Battle of Ulundi – 1879 – Anglo-Zulu War
 Action at Bronkhorstspruit – 1880 – First Boer War
 Battle of Laing's Nek – 1881 – First Boer War
 Battle of Majuba Hill – 1881 – First Boer War
 Battle of Schuinshoogte – 1881 – First Boer War
 Battle of Talana Hill – 1899 – Second Boer War
 Battle of Elandslaagte – 1899 – Second Boer War
 Battle of Stormberg – 1899 – Second Boer War
 Battle of Magersfontein – 1899 – Second Boer War
 Battle of Colenso – 1899 – Second Boer War
 Battle of Modder River – 1899 – Second Boer War
 Battle of Faber's Put – 1900 – Second Boer War
 Siege of Kimberley – 1899–1900 – Second Boer War
 Siege of Ladysmith – 1899–1900 – Second Boer War
 Siege of Mafeking – 1899–1900 – Second Boer War
 Battle of Sanna's Post – 1900 – Second Boer War
 Battle of Spion Kop – 1900 – Second Boer War
 Battle of Witpoort – 1900 – Second Boer War
 Battle of Paardeberg – 1900 – Second Boer War

South Korea 

 Battle of Hwangsanbeol – 660 – Baekje–Tang War (Goguryeo–Tang War)
 Battle of Baekgang – 663 – Goguryeo–Tang War
 Siege of Busanjin – 1592 – Japanese invasions of Korea (1592–1598)
 Battle of Dadaejin – 1592 – 
 Siege of Dongnae – 1592 – Japanese invasions of Korea (1592–1598)
 Battle of Sangju (1592) – 1592 – Japanese invasions of Korea (1592–1598)
 Battle of Chungju – 1592 – Japanese invasions of Korea (1592–1598)
 Battle of Okpo – 1592 – Japanese invasions of Korea (1592–1598)
 Battle of Happo – 1592 – Japanese invasions of Korea (1592–1598)
 Battle of Jeokjinpo – 1592 – Japanese invasions of Korea (1592–1598)
 Battle of Sacheon (1592) – 1592 – Japanese invasions of Korea (1592–1598)
 Battle of Imjin River (1592) – 1592 – Japanese invasions of Korea (1592–1598)
 Battle of Dangpo – 1592 – Japanese invasions of Korea (1592–1598)
 Battle of Danghangpo – 1592 – Japanese invasions of Korea (1592–1598)
 Battle of Yongin – 1592 – Japanese invasions of Korea (1592–1598)
 Battle of Ichi – 1592 – Japanese invasions of Korea (1592–1598)
 Battle of Hansan Island – 1592 – Japanese invasions of Korea (1592–1598)
 Battle of Angolpo – 1592 – Japanese invasions of Korea (1592–1598)
 Battle of Cheongju – 1592 – Japanese invasions of Korea (1592–1598)
 Siege of Yeongwon – 1592 – Japanese invasions of Korea (1592–1598)
 Battle of Busan (1592) – 1592 – Japanese invasions of Korea (1592–1598)
 Siege of Jinju (1592) – 1592 – Japanese invasions of Korea (1592–1598)
 Battle of Byeokjegwan – 1593 – Japanese invasions of Korea (1592–1598)
 Battle of Haengju – 1593 – Japanese invasions of Korea (1592–1598)
 Siege of Jinju (1593) – 1593 – Japanese invasions of Korea (1592–1598)
 Battle of Chilcheollyang – 1597 – Japanese invasions of Korea (1592–1598)
 Siege of Namwon – 1597 – Japanese invasions of Korea (1592–1598)
 Battle of Jiksan – 1597 – Japanese invasions of Korea (1592–1598)
 Battle of Myeongnyang – 1597 – Japanese invasions of Korea (1592–1598)
 Siege of Ulsan – 1598 – Japanese invasions of Korea (1592–1598)
 Siege of Suncheon – 1598 – Japanese invasions of Korea (1592–1598)
 Second siege of Ulsan – 1598 – Japanese invasions of Korea (1592–1598)
 Battle of Sacheon (1598) – 1598 – Japanese invasions of Korea (1592–1598)
 Battle of Noryang – 1598 – Japanese invasions of Korea (1592–1598)

Spain
 Siege of Saguntum – 219 BC – Second Punic War (Punic Wars)
 Battle of Cissa – 218 BC – Second Punic War (Punic Wars)
 Battle of Ebro River – 217 BC – Second Punic War (Punic Wars)
 Battle of Ibera – 215 BC – Second Punic War (Punic Wars)
 Battle of the Upper Baetis – 211 BC – Second Punic War (Punic Wars)
 Battle of Cartagena (209 BC) – 209 BC – Second Punic War (Punic Wars)
 Battle of Baecula – 208 BC – Second Punic War (Punic Wars)
 Battle of Carmona – 207 BC – Second Punic War (Punic Wars)
 Battle of Ilipa – 206 BC – Second Punic War (Punic Wars)
 Battle of Carteia – 206 BC – Second Punic War (Punic Wars)
 Battle of Carteia (naval) – 206 BC – Second Punic War (Punic Wars)
 Battle of Ilerda – 49 BC – Caesar's Civil War
 Battle off Carteia (46 BC) – 46 BC – Caesar's civil war
 Battle of Munda – 45 BC – Caesar's Civil War
 Siege of Corduba – 45 BC – Caesar's civil war
 Battle of Lauro – 45 BC – Caesar's civil war
 Battle of the Nervasos Mountains – 419 – Roman–Germanic wars and Fall of the Western Roman Empire
 Battle of Tarraco – 422 – Fall of the Western Roman Empire
 Battle of Mérida (428) – 428 – Fall of the Western Roman Empire
 Battle of Órbigo (456) – 456 – Roman–Germanic wars
 Battle of Cartagena (461) – 460 or 461 – Roman–Germanic wars and Fall of the Western Roman Empire
 Battle of Guadalete – 711 – Umayyad conquest of Hispania
 Battle of Covadonga – 718 or 722 – Reconquista
 Battle of Roncevaux Pass – 778 – Reconquista
 Battle of the Burbia River – 791 – Reconquista
 Battle of Lutos – 794 – Reconquista
 Battle of Las Babias – 795 – Reconquista
 Siege of Barcelona (801) – 800 – 801 – Reconquista
 Siege of Tortosa (808–809) – 808 – 809 – Reconquista
 Battle of Pancorbo (816) – 816 – Reconquista
 Battle of Roncevaux Pass (824) – 824 – Reconquista
 Battle of Albelda (851) – 851 – Reconquista
 Battle of Guadalacete – 852 – Reconquista
 Battle of Monte Laturce – ??? – Reconquista
 Battle of the Morcuera – 865 – Reconquista
 Battle of Polvoraria – 878 – Reconquista
 First Battle of Cellorigo – 882 – Reconquista
 Second Battle of Cellorigo – 883 – Reconquista
 Raid of 897 against Barcelona – 897 – Reconquista
 Day of Zamora – 901 – Reconquista
 Raid of 904 in Pallars and Ribagorza – 904 – Reconquista
 Battle of San Esteban de Gormaz (917) – 917 – Reconquista
 Battle of Valdejunquera – 920 – Reconquista
 Battle of Alhandic – 939 – Reconquista
 Battle of Simancas – 939 – Reconquista
 Battle of Estercuel – 975 – Reconquista
 Battle of Torrevicente – 981 – Reconquista
 Battle of Rueda – 981 – Reconquista
 Battle of Cervera – 1000 – Reconquista
 Battle of Torà – 1003 – Reconquista
 Battle of Albesa – 1003 – Reconquista
 Sacks of Córdoba (1009–1013) – 1009 – 1010 – Fitna of al-Andalus
 Battle of Aqbat al-Bakr – 1010 – Fitna of al-Andalus and Reconquista
 Sacks of Córdoba (1009–1013) – 1010 – 1013 – Fitna of al-Andalus
 Battle of Atapuerca – 1054 – Reconquista
 Battle of Graus – 1063 – Reconquista
 Crusade of Barbastro – 1064 – Reconquista
 Battle of Paterna – 1065 – Reconquista
 Battle of Llantada – 1068 – Reconquista
 Battle of Golpejera – 1072 – Reconquista
 Battle of Cabra – 1079 – Reconquista
 Battle of Piedra Pisada – 1084 – Reconquista
 Battle of Morella – 1084 or 1088 – Reconquista
 Battle of Sagrajas – 1086 – Reconquista
 Siege of Tudela – 1087 – Reconquista
 Battle of Alcoraz – 1096 – Reconquista
 Battle of Bairén – 1097 – Reconquista
 Battle of Consuegra – 1097 – Reconquista
 Battle of Mollerussa – 1102 – Reconquista
 Battle of Uclés – 1108 – Reconquista
 Battle of Candespina – 1111 – Reconquista
 Battle of Cutanda – 1120 – Reconquista
 Battle of Fraga – 1134 – Reconquista
 Siege of Coria (1138) – 1138 – Reconquista
 Siege of Oreja – 1139 – Reconquista
 Siege of Coria (1142) – 1142 – Reconquista
 Battle of Montiel (1143) – 1143 – Reconquista
 Siege of Almería (1147) – 1147 – Reconquista
 Siege of Tortosa (1148) – 1148 – Reconquista and Second Crusade (Crusades)
 Battle of Alarcos – 1195 – Reconquista
 Siege of Al-Dāmūs – 1210 – Reconquista
 Battle of Las Navas de Tolosa – 1212 – Reconquista
 Siege of Jaén (1225) – 1225 – Reconquista
 Battle of Portopí – 1229 – Conquest of Majorca (Reconquista)
 Siege of Jaén (1230) – 1230 – Reconquista
 Battle of Jerez – 1231 – Reconquista
 Siege of Burriana – 1233 – Reconquista
 Siege of Córdoba (1236) – 1236 – Reconquista
 Battle of the Puig – 1237 – Reconquista
 Siege of Jaén (1245–1246) – 1245 – 1246 – Reconquista
 Siege of Seville – 1247 – 1248 – Reconquista
 Siege of Jerez (1261) – 1261 – Reconquista
 Battle of Écija (1275) – 1275 – Reconquista
 Battle of Martos – 1275 – Reconquista
 Battle of Algeciras (1278) – 1278 – Reconquista
 Siege of Algeciras (1278–1279) – 1278 – 1279 – Reconquista
 Battle of Moclín (1280) – 1280 – Reconquista
 Battle of Les Formigues – 1285 – Aragonese Crusade (Crusades and War of the Sicilian Vespers)
 Battle of the Col de Panissars – 1285 – Aragonese Crusade (Crusades and War of the Sicilian Vespers)
 Battle of Iznalloz – 1295 – Reconquista
 Siege of Algeciras (1309–1310) – 1309 – 1310 – Reconquista
 Siege of Almería (1309) – 1309 – Reconquista
 Battle of the Vega of Granada – 1319 – Reconquista
 Battle of Teba – 1330 – Reconquista
 Battle of Vega de Pagana – 1339 – Reconquista
 Battle of Río Salado – 1340 – Reconquista
 Battle of Estepona – 1342 – Reconquista
 Siege of Algeciras (1342–1344) – 1342 – 1344 – Reconquista
 Battle of Barcelona (1359) – 1359 – War of the Two Peters (Hundred Years' War)
 Battle of Araviana – 1359 – War of the Two Peters and Castilian Civil War (both part of the Hundred Years' War)
 Battle of Linuesa – 1361 – Reconquista
 Battle of Guadix – 1362 – Reconquista
 Battle of Nájera or Battle of Navarrete – 1367 – Castilian Civil War (Hundred Years' War)
 Siege of León (1368) – Castilian Civil War (Hundred Years' War)
 Battle of Montiel – 1369 – Reconquista and Castilian Civil War (Hundred Years' War)
 Siege of Algeciras (1369) – 1369 – Reconquista
 Battle of Valverde (1385) – 1385 – 1383–1385 Portuguese interregnum (Hundred Years' War)
 Nasrid raid on Murcia (1392) – 1392 – Reconquista
 Battle of Collejares – 1406 – Reconquista
 Conquest of Ceuta – 1415 – Moroccan–Portuguese conflicts (Portuguese Empire) and Reconquista
 Siege of Ceuta (1419) – 1419 – Moroccan–Portuguese conflicts (Portuguese Empire) and Reconquista
 Battle of La Higueruela – 1431 – Reconquista
 Battle of Los Alporchones – 1452 – Reconquista
 Siege of Burgos (1475) – 1475 – War of the Castilian Succession
 Battle of Toro – 1476 – War of the Castilian Succession
 Battle of Lucena – 1483 – Granada War (Reconquista)
 Siege of Málaga (1487) – 1487 – Granada War (Reconquista)
 First Battle of Acentejo – 1494
 Battle of Aguere – 1494
 Second Battle of Acentejo – 1494
 Conquest of Melilla – 1497 – Reconquista
 Battle of Tordesillas (1520) – 1520 – Revolt of the Comuneros
 Battle of Villalar – 1521 – Revolt of the Comuneros
 Battle of Pampeluna – 1521 – Italian War of 1521–1526 (Italian Wars)
 Battle of Noáin or Battle of Esquiroz – 1521 – Italian War of 1521–1526 (Italian Wars)
 Siege of Fuenterrabía (1523–1524) – 1523 – 1524 – Italian War of 1521–1526 (Italian Wars)
 Battle of Muros Bay – 1543 – Italian War of 1542–1546 (Italian Wars)
 Battle of Bayona Islands (1590) – 1590 – Anglo-Spanish War (1585–1604) and Ten Years (Eighty Years' War) (Eighty Years' War) [European wars of religion]
 Battle of the Strait of Gibraltar (1590) – 1590 – Anglo-Spanish War (1585–1604)
 Battle of the Strait of Gibraltar (1591) – 1591 – Anglo-Spanish War (1585–1604)
 Battle of the Gulf of Almería (1591) – 1591 – Anglo-Spanish War (1585–1604) and Ten Years (Eighty Years' War) (Eighty Years' War) [European wars of religion]
 Battle of Las Palmas – 1595 – Anglo-Spanish War (1585–1604)
 Capture of Cádiz – 1596 – Anglo-Spanish War (1585–1604)
 Battle of Gibraltar (1607) – 1607 – Eighty Years' War, 1599–1609 (Eighty Years' War) [European wars of religion]
 Battle of Gibraltar (1618) – 1618 – Eighty Years' War (European wars of religion)
 Battle of Gibraltar (1621) – 1621 – Eighty Years' War, 1621–1648 (Eighty Years' War and Thirty Years' War) [European wars of religion]
 Siege of Fuenterrabía (1638) – 1638 – Franco-Spanish War (1635–1659) (Thirty Years' War)
 Battle of Getaria – 1638 – Franco-Spanish War (1635–1659) (Thirty Years' War)
 Battle of Cádiz (1640) – 1640 – Franco-Spanish War (1635–1659) (Thirty Years' War)
 Battle of Cambrils – 1640 – Reapers' War (Franco-Spanish War (1635–1659)) [Thirty Years' War]
 Battle of Martorell (1641) – 1641 – Reapers' War (Franco-Spanish War (1635–1659)) [Thirty Years' War]
 Battle of Montjuïc (1641) – 1641 – Reapers' War (Franco-Spanish War (1635–1659)) [Thirty Years' War]
 Naval battle of Tarragona – 1641 – Reapers' War (Franco-Spanish War (1635–1659)) [Thirty Years' War]
 Battle of Tarragona (August 1641) – 1641 – Reapers' War (Franco-Spanish War (1635–1659)) [Thirty Years' War]
 Battle of Montmeló – 1642 – Reapers' War and (Franco-Spanish War (1635–1659)) [Thirty Years' War]
 Battle of Barcelona – 1642 – Reapers' War (Franco-Spanish War (1635–1659)) [Thirty Years' War]
 Battle of Lleida (1642)) – 1642 – Reapers' War (Franco-Spanish War (1635–1659)) [Thirty Years' War]
 Battle of Cartagena (1643) – 1643 – Franco-Spanish War (1635–1659) (Thirty Years' War)
 Siege of Lleida (1644) – 1644 – Reapers' War (Franco-Spanish War (1635–1659)) [Thirty Years' War]
 Battle of Montijo – 1644 – Portuguese Restoration War
 Action of 23 November 1650 – 1650 – Franco-Spanish War (1635–1659) (Thirty Years' War)
 Capture of the galleon Lion Couronné – 1651 – Franco-Spanish War (1635–1659) (Thirty Years' War)
 Siege of Barcelona (1651) – 1651 – 1652 – Reapers' War (Franco-Spanish War (1635–1659)) [Thirty Years' War]
 Raid on Málaga (1656) – 1656 – Anglo-Spanish War (1654–1660) (Franco-Spanish War (1635–16)59)) [Thirty Years' War]
 Battle of Cádiz (1656) – 1656 – Anglo-Spanish War (1654–1660) (Franco-Spanish War (1635–1)659)) [Thirty Years' War]
 Battle of Santa Cruz de Tenerife (1657) – 1657 – Anglo-Spanish War (1654–1660) (Franco-Spanish War (1635–1659)) [Thirty Years' War]
 Siege of Badajoz (1658) – 1658 – Portuguese Restoration War
 Battle of Torroella – 1694 – Nine Years' War
 Sieges of Ceuta (1694–1727) – 1694 – 1720 and 1721 – 1727
 Battle of Sant Esteve d'en Bas – 1695 – Nine Years' War
 Siege of Barcelona (1697) – 1697 – Nine Years' War
 Battle of Cádiz (1702) – 1702 – War of the Spanish Succession
 Battle of Vigo Bay – 1702 – War of the Spanish Succession
 Landing at Barcelona (1704) – 1704 – War of the Spanish Succession
 Battle of Málaga (1704) – 1704 – War of the Spanish Succession
 Battle of Cabrita Point – 1705 – War of the Spanish Succession
 Battle of Montjuïc (1705) – 1705 – War of the Spanish Succession
 Siege of Barcelona (1705) – 1705 – War of the Spanish Succession
 Siege of Badajoz (1705) – 1705 – War of the Spanish Succession
 Siege of Barcelona (1706) – 1706 – War of the Spanish Succession
 Siege of Alcántara (1706) – 1706 – War of the Spanish Succession
 Battle of Murcia – 1706 – War of the Spanish Succession
 Battle of El Albujón – 1706 – War of the Spanish Succession
 Battle of Santa Cruz de Tenerife (1706) – 1706 – War of the Spanish Succession
 Battle of Almansa – 1707 – War of the Spanish Succession
 Siege of Xàtiva (1707) – 1707 – War of the Spanish Succession
 Siege of Ciudad Rodrigo (1707) – 1707 – War of the Spanish Succession
 Siege of Tortosa (1708) – 1708 – War of the Spanish Succession
 Capture of Minorca (1708) – 1708 – War of the Spanish Succession
 Siege of Alicante – 1708 – 1709 – War of the Spanish Succession
 Battle of La Gudiña – 1709 – War of the Spanish Succession
 Battle of Almenar – 1710 – War of the Spanish Succession
 Battle of Saragossa – 1710 – War of the Spanish Succession
 Battle of Brihuega – 1710 – War of the Spanish Succession
 Battle of Villaviciosa – 1710 – War of the Spanish Succession
 Siege of Barcelona (1713–1714) – 1713 – 1714 – War of the Spanish Succession
 Siege of San Sebastián (1719) – 1719 – War of the Quadruple Alliance
 Capture of Vigo – 1719 – War of the Quadruple Alliance
 Action of 11 March 1727 – 1727 – Anglo-Spanish War (1727–1729)
 Action of 8 April 1740 – 1740 – War of Jenkins' Ear (War of the Austrian Succession)
 Attacks on Fuerteventura in 1740 – 1740 – War of Jenkins' Ear (War of the Austrian Succession)
 Siege of Fort St Philip (1756) – 1756 – Seven Years' War
 Battle of Minorca (1756) – 1756 – Seven Years' War
 Battle of Cartagena (1758) – 1758 – Seven Years' War
 Action of 29 April 1758 – 1758 – Seven Years' War
 Battle of Valencia de Alcántara – 1762 – Spanish invasion of Portugal (1762) (Fantastic War) [Seven Years' War]
 Action of 20 October 1778 – 1778 – American Revolutionary War
 Action of 8 January 1780 – 1780 – American Revolutionary War
 Action of 25 February 1781 – 1781 – American Revolutionary War
 Capture of HMS St. Fermin – 1781 – American Revolutionary War
 Invasion of Minorca (1781) – 1781 – 1782 – American Revolutionary War
 Action of 12 December 1782 – 1782 – American Revolutionary War
 Frigate action of 29 May 1794 – 1794 – Atlantic campaign of May 1794 (War of the First Coalition) [French Revolutionary Wars]
 Battle of the Gulf of Roses – 1795 – War of the First Coalition (French Revolutionary Wars)
 Action of 13 October 1796 – 1796 – Mediterranean campaign of 1793–1796 (War of the First Coalition) and Anglo-Spanish War (1796–1808) [French Revolutionary and Napoleonic Wars]
 Action of 19 December 1796 – 1796 – Mediterranean campaign of 1793–1796 (War of the First Coalition) and Anglo-Spanish War (1796–1808) [French Revolutionary and Napoleonic Wars]
 Action of 25 January 1797 – 1797 – Anglo-Spanish War (1796–1808) (French Revolutionary and Napoleonic Wars)
 Action of 26 April 1797 – 1797 – Anglo-Spanish War (1796–1808) (French Revolutionary and Napoleonic Wars)
 Assault on Cádiz – 1797 – Anglo-Spanish War (1796–1808) (French Revolutionary and Napoleonic Wars)
 Battle of Santa Cruz de Tenerife (1797) – 1797 – Anglo-Spanish War (1796–1808) (French Revolutionary and Napoleonic Wars)
 Action of 15 July 1798 – 1798 – Mediterranean campaign of 1798 (War of the Second Coalition) and Anglo-Spanish War (1796–1808) [French Revolutionary and Napoleonic Wars]
 Capture of Minorca (1798) – 1798 – Mediterranean campaign of 1798 (War of the Second Coalition) and Anglo-Spanish War (1796–1808) [French Revolutionary and Napoleonic Wars]
 Action of 6 February 1799 – 1799 – Anglo-Spanish War (1796–1808) (French Revolutionary and Napoleonic Wars)
 Action of 7 July 1799 – 1799 – Anglo-Spanish War (1796–1808) (French Revolutionary and Napoleonic Wars)
 Action of 16 October 1799 – 1799 – Anglo-Spanish War (1796–1808) (French Revolutionary and Napoleonic Wars)
 Action of 7 April 1800 – 1800 – Anglo-Spanish War (1796–1808) (French Revolutionary and Napoleonic Wars)
 Battle of Brion – 1800 – Anglo-Spanish War (1796–1808) (French Revolutionary and Napoleonic Wars)
 Action of 10 December 1800 – 1800 – Anglo-Spanish War (1796–1808) (French Revolutionary and Napoleonic Wars)
 Action of 6 May 1801 – 1801 – Anglo-Spanish War (1796–1808) (French Revolutionary and Napoleonic Wars)
 First Battle of Algeciras – 1801 – Anglo-Spanish War (1796–1808) and War of the Second Coalition (French Revolutionary and Napoleonic Wars)
 Second Battle of Algeciras – 1801 – Anglo-Spanish War (1796–1808) and War of the Second Coalition (French Revolutionary and Napoleonic Wars)
 Action of 25 November 1804 – 1804 – Anglo-Spanish War (1796–1808) (French Revolutionary and Napoleonic Wars)
 Battle of Cape Finisterre (1805) – 1805 – Anglo-Spanish War (1796–1808) and Trafalgar campaign (War of the Third Coalition) [French Revolutionary and Napoleonic Wars]
 Action of 10 August 1805 – 1805 – Trafalgar campaign (War of the Third Coalition) [Napoleonic Wars]
 Battle of Trafalgar – 1805 – Anglo-Spanish War (1796–1808) and Trafalgar campaign (War of the Third Coalition) [French Revolutionary and Napoleonic Wars]
 Battle of Cape Ortegal – 1805 – Trafalgar campaign (War of the Third Coalition) [Napoleonic Wars]
 Action of 4 April 1808 – 1808 – Anglo-Spanish War (1796–1808) (French Revolutionary and Napoleonic Wars)
 Dos de Mayo Uprising – 1808 – Peninsular War
 Battle of Valdepeñas – 1808 – Peninsular War
 Battles of El Bruch – 1808 – Peninsular War
 Battle of Alcolea Bridge – 1808 – Peninsular War
 Capture of the Rosily Squadron or Battle of Poza de Santa Isabel – 1808 – Peninsular War
 Battle of Cabezón – 1808 – Peninsular War
 First siege of Zaragoza – 1808 – Peninsular War
 Battle of Girona (1808) – 1808 – Peninsular War
 Battle of Valencia (1808) – 1808 – Peninsular War
 Battle of Medina de Rioseco – 1808 – Peninsular War
 Battle of Bailén – 1808 – Peninsular War
 Second siege of Girona – 1808 – Peninsular War
 Blockade of Barcelona – 1808 – Peninsular War
 Battle of Zornoza – 1808 – Peninsular War
 Battle of Valmaseda – 1808 – Peninsular War
 Siege of Roses (1808) – 1808 – Peninsular War
 Battle of Burgos – 1808 – Peninsular War
 Battle of Espinosa de los Monteros – 1808 – Peninsular War
 Battle of Tudela – 1808 – Peninsular War
 Battle of Somosierra – 1808 – Peninsular War
 Battle of Cardedeu – 1808 – Peninsular War
 Second siege of Zaragoza – 1808 – 1809 – Peninsular War
 Battle of Molins de Rei – 1808 – Peninsular War
 Battle of Sahagún – 1808 – Peninsular War
 Battle of Benavente – 1808 – Peninsular War
 Battle of Mansilla – 1808 – Peninsular War
 Battle of Castellón – 1809 – Peninsular War
 Battle of Cacabelos – 1809 – Peninsular War
 Battle of Uclés – 1809 – Peninsular War
 Battle of Corunna – 1809 – Peninsular War
 Battle of Valls – 1809 – Peninsular War
 Battle of Villafranca (1809) – 1809 – Peninsular War
 Battle of Miajadas – 1809 – Peninsular War
 Battle of Los Yébenes – 1809 – Peninsular War
 Battle of Ciudad Real – 1809 – Peninsular War
 Battle of Medellín – 1809 – Peninsular War
 Third siege of Girona – 1809 – Peninsular War
 Battle of Alcántara (1809) – 1809 – Peninsular War
 Battle of Alcañiz – 1809 – Peninsular War
 Battle of Puente Sanpayo – 1809 – Peninsular War
 Battle of María – 1809 – Peninsular War
 Battle of Belchite (1809) – 1809 – Peninsular War
 Battle of Talavera – 1809 – Peninsular War
 Battle of Almonacid – 1809 – Peninsular War
 Battle of Puerto de Baños – 1809 – Peninsular War
 Battle of Tamames – 1809 – Peninsular War
 Battle of Ocaña – 1809 – Peninsular War
 Battle of Carpio – 1809 – Peninsular War
 Battle of Alba de Tormes – 1809 – Peninsular War
 Battle of Mollet – 1810 – Peninsular War
 Siege of Cádiz – 1810 – 1812 – Peninsular War
 Battle of Vic – 1810 – Peninsular War
 Siege of Astorga – 1810 – Peninsular War
 Battle of Manresa (1810) – 1810 – Peninsular War
 Siege of Lérida – 1810 – Peninsular War
 Siege of Ciudad Rodrigo (1810) – 1810 – Peninsular War
 Siege of Mequinenza – 1810 – Peninsular War
 Combat of Barquilla (1810) – 1810 – Peninsular War
 Battle of La Bisbal – 1810 – Peninsular War
 Battle of Fuengirola – 1810 – Peninsular War
 Battle of Baza (1810) – 1810 – Peninsular War
 Siege of Tortosa (1810–1811) – 1810 – 1811 – Peninsular War
 Battle of El Pla – 1811 – Peninsular War
 Siege of Olivença – 1811 – Peninsular War
 First siege of Badajoz (1811) – 1811 – Peninsular War
 Battle of the Gebora – 1811 – Peninsular War
 Battle of Barrosa – 1811 – Peninsular War
 Siege of Figueras (1811) – 1811 – Peninsular War
 Second siege of Badajoz (1811) – 1811 – Peninsular War
 Battle of Fuentes de Oñoro – 1811 – Peninsular War
 Siege of Tarragona (1811) – 1811 – Peninsular War
 Battle of Albuera – 1811 – Peninsular War
 Battle of Usagre – 1811 – Peninsular War
 Battle of Arlabán (1811) – 1811 – Peninsular War
 Battle of Cogorderos – 1811 – Peninsular War
 Battle of Montserrat – 1811 – Peninsular War
 Battle of Zújar – 1811 – Peninsular War
 Battle of El Bodón – 1811 – Peninsular War
 Battle of Cervera (1811) – 1811 – Peninsular War
 Battle of Saguntum – 1811 – Peninsular War
 Battle of Arroyo dos Molinos – 1811 – Peninsular War
 Battle of Bornos (1811) – 1811 – Peninsular War
 Siege of Tarifa (1812) – 1811 – 1812 – Peninsular War
 Siege of Valencia (1812) – 1811 – 1812 – Peninsular War
 Battle of Navas de Membrillo – 1811 – Peninsular War
 Siege of Ciudad Rodrigo (1812) – 1812 – Peninsular War
 Battle of Altafulla – 1812 – Peninsular War
 Siege of Badajoz (1812) – 1812 – Peninsular War
 Battle of Arlabán (1812) – 1812 – Peninsular War
 Battle of Villagarcia – 1812 – Peninsular War
 Battle of Almaraz – 1812 – Peninsular War
 Battle of Bornos (1812) – 1812 – Peninsular War
 Battle of Maguilla – 1812 – Peninsular War
 Siege of the Salamanca forts – 1812 – Peninsular War
 Siege of Astorga (1812) – 1812 – Peninsular War
 Battle of Castalla (1812) – 1812 – Peninsular War
 Battle of Salamanca – 1812 – Peninsular War
 Battle of García Hernández – 1812 – Peninsular War
 Battle of Majadahonda – 1812 – Peninsular War
 Siege of Burgos – 1812 – Peninsular War
 Battle of Venta del Pozo – 1812 – Peninsular War
 Battle of Tordesillas (1812) – 1812 – Peninsular War
 Battle of Castalla – 1813 – Peninsular War
 Battle of Morales – 1813 – Peninsular War
 Siege of Tarragona (1813) – 1813 – Peninsular War
 Battle of San Millan-Osma – 1813 – Peninsular War
 Battle of Vitoria – 1813 – Peninsular War
 Battle of Tolosa (1813) – 1813 – Peninsular War
 Siege of Pamplona (1813) – 1813 – Peninsular War
 Siege of San Sebastián – 1813 – Peninsular War
 Battle of Maya – 1813 – Peninsular War
 Battle of Roncesvalles (1813) – 1813 – Peninsular War
 Battle of Sorauren – 1813 – Peninsular War
 Battle of San Marcial – 1813 – Peninsular War
 Battle of Ordal – 1813 – Peninsular War
 Battle off Cape Gata – 1815 – Second Barbary War
 Battle of Cape Palos (1815) – 1815 – Second Barbary War
 Battle of Mayals – 1834 – First Carlist War (Carlist Wars)
 Battle of Alsasua – 1834 – First Carlist War (Carlist Wars)
 Battle of Gulina – 1834 – First Carlist War (Carlist Wars)
 Battle of Alegría de Álava – 1834 – First Carlist War (Carlist Wars)
 Battle of Venta de Echavarri – 1834 – First Carlist War (Carlist Wars)
 Battle of Mendaza – 1834 – First Carlist War (Carlist Wars)
 First Battle of Arquijas – 1834 – First Carlist War (Carlist Wars)
 Second Battle of Arquijas – 1835 – First Carlist War (Carlist Wars)
 Battle of Artaza – 1835 – First Carlist War (Carlist Wars)
 Battle of Mendigorría – 1835 – First Carlist War (Carlist Wars)
 Battle of Arlabán – 1836 – First Carlist War (Carlist Wars)
 Battle of Tirapegui – 1836 – First Carlist War (Carlist Wars)
 Battle of Villarrobledo – 1836 – First Carlist War (Carlist Wars)
 Battle of Majaceite – 1836 – First Carlist War (Carlist Wars)
 Battle of Luchana – 1836 – First Carlist War (Carlist Wars)
 Battle of Oriamendi – 1837 – First Carlist War (Carlist Wars)
 Battle of Huesca – 1837 – First Carlist War (Carlist Wars)
 Battle of Villar de los Navarros – 1837 – First Carlist War (Carlist Wars)
 Battle of Andoain – 1837 – First Carlist War (Carlist Wars)
 Battle of Aranzueque – 1837 – First Carlist War (Carlist Wars)
 Battle of Peñacerrada – 1838 – First Carlist War (Carlist Wars)
 Battle of Maella – 1838 – First Carlist War (Carlist Wars)
 Battle of Ramales – 1839 – First Carlist War (Carlist Wars)
 Battle of Badajoz (1936) – Spanish Civil War
 Battle of Guadalajara – 1937 – Spanish Civil War
 Battle of El Mazuco – 1937 – Spanish Civil War
 Battle of the Ebro – 1938 – Spanish Civil War

Sri Lanka 

 Siege of Kotte (1557–1558) – 1557 – 1558 – Sinhalese–Portuguese War (Crisis of the Sixteenth Century)
 Battle of Mulleriyawa – 1559 – Sinhalese–Portuguese War (Crisis of the Sixteenth Century)
 Siege of Colombo – 1587 – 1588 – Sinhalese–Portuguese War (Crisis of the Sixteenth Century)
 Battle of Randeniwela – 1630 – Sinhalese–Portuguese War (Crisis of the Sixteenth Century)
 Battle of Gannoruwa – 1638 – Sinhalese–Portuguese War (Crisis of the Sixteenth Century)
 Siege of Galle (1640) – 1640 – Sinhalese–Portuguese War (Crisis of the Sixteenth Century) and Dutch–Portuguese War
 Action of 23 March 1654 – 1654 – Dutch–Portuguese War
 Action of 2 May 1654 – 1654 – Dutch–Portuguese War
 Capture of Trincomalee – 1782 – Fourth Anglo-Dutch War (American Revolutionary War)
 Battle of Providien – 1782 – Anglo-French War (1778–1783) (American Revolutionary War)
 Action of 12 August 1782 – 1782 – American Revolutionary War
 Battle of Trincomalee – 1782 – American Revolutionary War

Sudan 

 Battle of Suakin (1541) – 1541 – Ottoman–Portuguese conflicts (1538–1559) (Ottoman–Portuguese confrontations)

Suriname 

 Recapture of Fort Zeelandia (1667) – 1667 – Second Anglo-Dutch War (Anglo-Dutch Wars)
 Battle of Suriname – 1804

Sweden
 Battle at Lake Vænir
 Battle of the Brávellir – c. 750
 Battle of Fotevik – 1134 – Danish Civil Wars
 Battle of Skanör – 1289
 Battle of Brunkeberg – 1471 – Dano-Swedish War (1470–1471)
 Battle of Falun – 1521 – Swedish War of Liberation (Dano-Swedish War)
 Battle of Brunnbäck Ferry – 1521 – Swedish War of Liberation (Dano-Swedish War)
 Battle of Västerås – 1521 – Swedish War of Liberation (Dano-Swedish War)
 Conquest of Uppsala – 1521 – Swedish War of Liberation (Dano-Swedish War)
 Conquest of Kalmar – 1523 – Swedish War of Liberation (Dano-Swedish War)
 Conquest of Stockholm – 1523 – Swedish War of Liberation (Dano-Swedish War)
 Battle of Öland (1563) – 1563 – Northern Seven Years' War (Dano-Swedish War and Polish–Swedish wars)
 Battle of Mared – 1563 – Northern Seven Years' War (Dano-Swedish War and Polish–Swedish wars)
 First battle of Öland (1564) – 1564 – Northern Seven Years' War (Dano-Swedish War and Polish–Swedish wars)
 Action of 14 August 1564 – 1564 – Northern Seven Years' War (Dano-Swedish War and Polish–Swedish wars)
 Battle of Axtorna – 1565 – Northern Seven Years' War (Dano-Swedish War and Polish–Swedish wars)
 Action of 26 July 1566 – 1566 – Northern Seven Years' War (Dano-Swedish War and Polish–Swedish wars)
 Battle of Brobacka – 1566 – Northern Seven Years' War (Dano-Swedish War and Polish–Swedish wars)
 Siege of Varberg – 1569 – Northern Seven Years' War (Dano-Swedish War and Polish–Swedish wars)
 Battle of Stegeborg – 1598 – War against Sigismund
 Battle of Stångebro – 1598 – War against Sigismund
 Siege of Kalmar – 1611 – Kalmar War
 Storming of Kristianopel – 1611 – Kalmar War
 Battle of Vittsjö – 1612 – Kalmar War
 Battle of Bysjön – 1644 – Torstenson War (Thirty Years' War)
 Battle of the Sound – 1658 – Second Northern War (Northern Wars)
 Battle of Öland – 1676 – Scanian War (Franco-Dutch War and Northern Wars)
 Battle of Halmstad – 1676 – Scanian War (Franco-Dutch War and Northern Wars)
 Battle of Lund – 1676 – Scanian War (Franco-Dutch War and Northern Wars)
 Siege of Malmö – 1677 – Scanian War (Franco-Dutch War and Northern Wars)
 Battle of Marstrand – 1677 – Scanian War (Franco-Dutch War and Northern Wars)
 Battle of Landskrona – 1677 – Scanian War (Franco-Dutch War and Northern Wars)
 Battle of Uddevalla – 1677 – Scanian War (Franco-Dutch War and Northern Wars)
 Battle of Helsingborg – 1710 – Great Northern War (Northern Wars)
 Battle of Dynekilen – 1716 – Norway during the Great Northern War (Great Northern War) [Northern Wars]
 Attack on Nya Varvet – 1717 – Great Northern War (Northern Wars)
 Battle of Strömstad – 1717 – Great Northern War (Northern Wars)
 Attack on Marstrand – 1719 – Great Northern War (Northern Wars)
 Battle of Stäket – 1719 – Great Northern War (Northern Wars)
 Attack on Nya Älvsborg – 1719 – Great Northern War (Northern Wars)
 Battle of Kvistrum – 1788 – Theatre War (Russo-Swedish War (1788–1790))
 Battle of Öland (1789) – 1789 – Russo-Swedish War (1788–1790)
 Battle of Furuholm – 1808 – Dano-Swedish War of 1808–1809 (Napoleonic Wars)
 Battle of Skellefteå – 1809 – Finnish War (Napoleonic Wars)
 Battle of Hörnefors – 1809 – Finnish War (Napoleonic Wars)
 Battle of Sävar – 1809 – Finnish War (Napoleonic Wars)
 Battle of Ratan – 1809 – Finnish War (Napoleonic Wars)
 Battle of Piteå – 1809 – Finnish War (Napoleonic Wars)

Switzerland

 Battle of Octodurus – 57 BC – 56 BC – Gallic Wars
 Battle of Vindonissa – 298 or 302 – Roman–Germanic wars
 Battle of Morgarten – 1315 – Growth of the Old Swiss Confederacy
 Battle of Castione – 1449 – Milanese War of Succession (Wars in Lombardy)
 Battle on the Planta – 1475 – Burgundian Wars
 Battle of Grandson – 1476 – Burgundian Wars
 Battle of Morat – 1476 – Burgundian Wars
 Battle of Bruderholz – 1499 – Swabian War
 Battle of Schwaderloh – 1499 – Swabian War
 Battle of Calven – 1499 – Swabian War
 Battle of Dornach – 1499 – Swabian War
 Siege of Rheinfelden (1633) – 1633 – Swedish intervention in the Thirty Years' War (Thirty Years' War)
 Battle of Rheinfelden – 1638 – Thirty Years' War
 Capture of Porrentruy – 1792 – War of the First Coalition (French Revolutionary Wars)
 Battle of Grauholz – 1798 – French invasion of Switzerland (French Revolutionary Wars)
 Battle of Frauenfeld – 1799 – War of the Second Coalition (French Revolutionary Wars)
 Battle of Winterthur – 1799 – War of the Second Coalition (French Revolutionary Wars)
 First Battle of Zurich – 1799 – War of the Second Coalition (French Revolutionary Wars)
 Battle of Oberwald – 1799 – War of the Second Coalition (French Revolutionary Wars)
 Battle of Amsteg – 1799 – War of the Second Coalition (French Revolutionary Wars)
 Battle of Schwyz – 1799 – War of the Second Coalition (French Revolutionary Wars)
 Battle of Gotthard Pass – 1799 – War of the Second Coalition (French Revolutionary Wars)
 Second Battle of Zurich – 1799 – War of the Second Coalition (French Revolutionary Wars)
 Battle of Linth River – 1799 – War of the Second Coalition (French Revolutionary Wars)

Syria 

 Battle of Qarqar – 853 BC – Assyrian conquest of Aram
 Battle of Carchemish – c. 605 BC – Egyptian–Babylonian wars
 Battle of Hamath – c. 605 BC – Egyptian–Babylonian wars
 Siege of Apamea – 45 BC – 44 BC – Caesar's civil war
 Battle of Mount Gindarus – 38 BC – Pompeian–Parthian invasion of 40 BC (Roman–Parthian Wars)
 Battle of Resaena – 243 – Roman–Persian Wars
 Battle of Barbalissos – 252 – Roman–Persian Wars
 Siege of Dura-Europos (256) – 256 – Roman–Persian Wars
 Sack of Bostra – 270 – Crisis of the Third Century
 Battle of Emesa – 272 – Crisis of the Third Century
 Battle of Thannuris – 528 – Iberian War
 Battle of Callinicum – 531 – Iberian War
 Battle of Marj Rahit (634) – 634 – Muslim conquest of the Levant (Arab–Byzantine wars)
 Battle of al-Qaryatayn – 634 – Muslim conquest of the Levant (Arab–Byzantine wars)
 Battle of Bosra – 634 – Muslim conquest of the Levant (Arab–Byzantine wars)
 Battle of Marj al-Saffar (634) – 634 – Muslim conquest of the Levant (Arab–Byzantine wars)
 Siege of Damascus (634) – 634 – Muslim conquest of the Levant (Arab–Byzantine wars)
 Battle of Maraj-al-Debaj – 634 – Muslim conquest of the Levant (Arab–Byzantine wars)
 Battle of Marj ar-Rum – 635 – Muslim conquest of the Levant (Arab–Byzantine wars)
 Siege of Emesa – 635 – 636 – Muslim conquest of the Levant (Arab–Byzantine wars)
 Battle of the Yarmuk – 636 – Muslim conquest of the Levant (Arab–Byzantine wars)
 Siege of Laodicea (636) – 636 – Muslim conquest of the Levant (Arab–Byzantine wars)
 Battle of Hazir – 637 – Muslim conquest of the Levant (Arab–Byzantine wars)
 Siege of Aleppo (637) – 637 – Muslim conquest of the Levant (Arab–Byzantine wars)
 Siege of Emesa (638) – 638 – Muslim conquest of the Levant (Arab–Byzantine wars)
 Battle of Siffin – 657 – First Fitna
 Battle of Marj Rahit (684) – 684 – Second Fitna
 Battle of Ayn al-Warda – 685 – Second Fitna
 Sack of Aleppo (962) – 962 – Arab–Byzantine wars
 Battle of the Orontes – 994 – Arab–Byzantine wars
 Siege of Aleppo (994–995) – 994 – 995 – Arab–Byzantine wars
 Battle of Apamea – 998 – Arab–Byzantine wars
 Battle of Azaz (1030) – 1030 – Arab–Byzantine wars
 Siege of Ma'arra – 1098 – First Crusade (Crusades)
 Battle of Shaizar – 1111 – Crusades
 Battle of Sarmin – 1115 – Crusades
 Battle of Ager Sanguinis – 1119 – Crusades
 Battle of Hab – 1119 – Crusades
 Siege of Aleppo (1124) – 1124 – 1125 – Crusades
 Battle of Azaz (1125) – 1125 – Crusades
 Battle of Marj al-Saffar (1126) – 1126 – Crusades
 Battle of al-Atharib (1130) – 1130 – Crusades
 Battle of Rafaniyya – 1133 – Crusades
 Battle of Qinnasrin – 1135 – Crusades
 Battle of Ba'rin – 1137 – Crusades
 Siege of Aleppo (1138) – 1138 – Crusades
 Siege of Shaizar – 1138 – Crusades
 Battle of Bosra (1147) – 1147 – Crusades
 Siege of Damascus (1148) – 1148 – Second Crusade (Crusades)
 Battle of Inab – 1149 – Crusades
 Battle of Harim – 1164 – Crusades
 First Battle of Homs – 1260 – Mongol invasions of the Levant
 Fall of Krak des Chevaliers – 1271 – Crusades
 Second Battle of Homs – 1281 – Mongol invasions of the Levant and Crusades
 Battle of Wadi al-Khaznadar – 1299 – Mongol invasions of the Levant
 Fall of Ruad – 1302 – Crusades
 Battle of Marj al-Saffar (1303) – 1303 – Mongol invasions of the Levant
 Sack of Aleppo (1400) – 1400 – Timurid conquests and invasions
 Siege of Damascus (1400) – 1400 – Timurid conquests and invasions
 Battle of Marj Dabiq – 1516 – Ottoman–Mamluk War (1516–1517) (Ottoman wars in Asia)

Taiwan 

 Battle of Liaoluo Bay – 1633 – Sino-Dutch conflicts
 Battle of San Salvador (1641) – 1641 – Eighty Years' War, 1621–1648 (Eighty Years' War and Thirty Years' War) [European wars of religion]
 Battle of San Salvador (1642) – 1642 – Eighty Years' War, 1621–1648 (Eighty Years' War and Thirty Years' War) [European wars of religion]
 Siege of Fort Zeelandia – 1661 – 1662 – Sino-Dutch conflicts

Tajikistan 

 Siege of Cyropolis – 329 BC – Wars of Alexander the Great
 Battle of Jaxartes – 329 BC – Wars of Alexander the Great
 Siege of the Sogdian Rock – 327 BC – Wars of Alexander the Great
 Day of Thirst – 724 – Muslim conquest of Transoxiana

Thailand
 Siege of Bangkok – 1688
Battle of Bangkaeo – 1775
Tha Din Daeng Campaign  – 1786
Paknam incident – 1893
Battle of Ko Chang – 1941
Battle of Prachuap Khiri Khan – 1941

Trinidad and Tobago 

 Action of March 1677 or Battle of Tobago – 1677 – Franco-Dutch War
 Invasion of Tobago – 1781 – American Revolutionary War
 Invasion of Trinidad (1797) – 1797 – Anglo-Spanish War (1796–1808) (French Revolutionary and Napoleonic Wars)

Tunisia 

 Siege of Aspis – 255 BC – First Punic War (Punic Wars)
 Battle of Adys – 255 BC – First Punic War (Punic Wars)
 Battle of the Bagradas River (255 BC) – 255 BC – First Punic War (Punic Wars)
 Battle of Cape Hermaeum – 255 BC – First Punic War (Punic Wars)
 Battle of Utica – 240 BC – Mercenary War (Punic Wars)
 Battle of the Bagradas River (240 BC) – 240 BC – Mercenary War (Punic Wars)
 Hamilcar's victory with Naravas – 240 BC – Mercenary War (Punic Wars)
 Battle of the Saw – 238 BC – Mercenary War (Punic Wars)
 Siege of Tunis (Mercenary War) – 238 BC – Mercenary War (Punic Wars)
 Battle of Leptis Parva – 238 BC – Mercenary War (Punic Wars)
 Siege of Utica (204 BC) – 204 BC – Second Punic War (Punic Wars)
 Battle of Utica (203 BC) – 203 BC – Second Punic War (Punic Wars)
 Battle of the Great Plains – 203 BC – Second Punic War (Punic Wars)
 Battle of Zama – 202 BC – Second Punic War (Punic Wars)
 Battle of Oroscopa – 151 BC – Third Punic War (Punic Wars)
 Battle of Lake Tunis – 149 BC – Third Punic War (Punic Wars)
 Battle of Nepheris (149 BC) – 149 BC – Third Punic War (Punic Wars)
 Siege of Carthage (Third Punic War) – c. 149 BC – 146 BC – Third Punic War (Punic Wars)
 Battle of the Port of Carthage – 147 BC – Third Punic War (Punic Wars)
 Battle of Nepheris (147 BC) – 147 BC – Third Punic War (Punic Wars)
 Siege of Zama – 109 BC – Jugurthine War
 Siege of Thala – 108 BC – Jugurthine War
 Battle of Utica (81 BC) – 81 BC – Sulla's civil war
 Battle of Utica (49 BC) – 49 BC – Caesar's civil war
 Battle of the Bagradas (49 BC) – 49 BC – Caesar's civil war
 Battle of Ruspina – 46 BC – Caesar's civil war
 Battle of Ascurum – 46 BC – Caesar's civil war
 Battle of Thapsus – 46 BC – Caesar's civil war
 Battle of Carthage (238) – 238 – Crisis of the Third Century
 Capture of Carthage (439) – 439 – Fall of the Western Roman Empire
 Battle of Cape Bon (468) – 468 – Roman–Germanic wars and Fall of the Western Roman Empire
 Battle of Ad Decimum – 533 – Vandalic War (Roman–Germanic wars)
 Battle of Tricamarum – 533 – Vandalic War (Roman–Germanic wars)
 Battle of Mammes – 534 – Berber Wars
 Battle of Bourgaon – 535 – Berber Wars
 Battle of the Bagradas River (536) – 536 – Berber Wars
 Battle of Thacia – 545 – Moorish wars (Berber Wars)
 Battle of Sufetula (546 or 547) – 546 or 547 – Moorish wars (Berber Wars)
 Battle of Sufetula (647) – 647 – Muslim conquest of the Maghreb (Arab–Byzantine wars)
 Battle of Carthage (698) – 698 – Muslim conquest of the Maghreb (Arab–Byzantine wars)
 Battle of Tabarka – 701 or 702 or 703 – Muslim conquest of the Maghreb (Arab–Byzantine wars)
 Conquest of Tunis (1534) – 1534 – Ottoman–Habsburg wars
 Conquest of Tunis (1535) – 1535 – Ottoman–Portuguese confrontations and Ottoman–Habsburg wars
 Battle of Kef (1694) – 1694 – Tunisian–Algerian War (1694) (Tunisian–Algerian Wars)
 Siege of Tunis (1694) – 1694 – Tunisian–Algerian War (1694) (Tunisian–Algerian Wars)

Turkey
 Battle of Nihriya – c. 1237 BC
 Fall of Harran – 610 BC – 609 BC – Medo-Babylonian conquest of the Assyrian Empire
 Battle of Carchemish – c. 605 BC – Egyptian–Babylonian wars
 Battle of the Eclipse – 585 BC – Lydo–Median war
 Battle of Pteria – 547 BC – Wars of Cyrus the Great
 Battle of Thymbra – 547 BC – Wars of Cyrus the Great
 Siege of Sardis (547 BC) – 547 BC – Wars of Cyrus the Great
 Siege of Sardis (498 BC) – 498 BC – Ionian Revolt
 Battle of Lade – 494 BC – Ionian Revolt
 Battle of Mycale – 479 BC – Second Persian invasion of Greece (Greco-Persian Wars)
 Battle of the Eurymedon – 469 BC or 466 BC – Wars of the Delian League (Greco-Persian Wars)
 Battle of Cynossema – 411 BC – Peloponnesian War
 Battle of Abydos – 411 BC – Peloponnesian War
 Battle of Cyzicus – 410 BC – Peloponnesian War
 Battle of Notium – 406 BC  – Peloponnesian War
 Battle of Arginusae – 406 BC – Peloponnesian War
 Battle of Aegospotami – 405 BC – Peloponnesian War
 Battle of Cnidus – 394 BC – Corinthian War
 Battle of the Granicus – 334 BC – Wars of Alexander the Great
 Siege of Miletus – 334 BC – Wars of Alexander the Great
 Siege of Halicarnassus – 334 BC – Wars of Alexander the Great
 Battle of Issus – 333 BC – Wars of Alexander the Great
 Battle of the Hellespont (321 BC) – 321 BC – First War of the Diadochi
 Battle of Orkynia – 319 BC – Wars of the Diadochi
 Battle of Cretopolis – 319 BC – Wars of the Diadochi
 Battle of Byzantium – 317 BC – Second War of the Diadochi
 Battle of White Tunis – 310 BC – Sicilian Wars
 Battle of Ipsus – 301 BC – Fourth War of the Diadochi
 Battle of Corupedium – 281 BC – Wars of the Diadochi
 Battle of Lysimachia – 277 BC – Celtic settlement of Southeast Europe
 Siege of Sardis (211 BC) – 211 BC
 Battle of Lade (201 BCE) – 201 BC – Cretan War (205–200 BC)
 Battle of Corycus – 191 BC – Roman–Seleucid War (Macedonian Wars)
 Battle of the Eurymedon (190 BC) – 190 BC – Roman–Seleucid War (Macedonian Wars)
 Battle of Myonessus – 190 BC – Roman–Seleucid War (Macedonian Wars)
 Battle of Magnesia – 190 BC or 189 BC – Roman–Seleucid War (Macedonian Wars)
 Battle of the Oenoparus – 145 BC – Syrian Wars
 Battle of the River Amnias – 89 BC – First Mithridatic War (Mithridatic Wars)
 Battle of Protopachium – 89 BC – First Mithridatic War (Mithridatic Wars)
 Battle of Mount Scorobas – 88 BC – First Mithridatic War (Mithridatic Wars)
 Battle of Tenedos (86 BC) – 86 BC – First Mithridatic War (Mithridatic Wars)
 Battle of Halys – 82 BC – Second Mithridatic War (Mithridatic Wars)
 Battle of Chalcedon (74 BC) – 74 BC – Third Mithridatic War (Mithridatic Wars)
 Siege of Cyzicus – 73 BC – Third Mithridatic War (Mithridatic Wars)
 Battle of the Rhyndacus (73 BC) – 73 BC – Third Mithridatic War (Mithridatic Wars)
 Siege of Heraclea – 72 BC – 71 BC – Third Mithridatic War (Mithridatic Wars)
 Battle of Cabira – 72 BC – Third Mithridatic War (Mithridatic Wars)
 Battle of Tigranocerta – 69 BC – Third Mithridatic War (Mithridatic Wars)
 Battle of Zela (67 BC) – 67 BC – Third Mithridatic War (Mithridatic Wars)
 Battle of the Lycus – 66 BC – Third Mithridatic War (Mithridatic Wars)
 Battle of Carrhae – 53 BC – Roman–Parthian Wars
 Battle of Nicopolis (48 BC) – 48 BC – Caesar's civil war
 Battle of Zela – 47 BC – Caesar's civil war
 Battle of the Cilician Gates – 39 BC – Pompeian–Parthian invasion of 40 BC (Roman–Parthian Wars)
 Battle of Amanus Pass – 39 BC – Pompeian–Parthian invasion of 40 BC (Roman–Parthian Wars)
 Battle of Issus (194) – 194 – Year of the Five Emperors
 Battle of Nisibis (217) – 217 – Parthian war of Caracalla (Roman–Parthian Wars)
 Siege of Nisibis (235) – 235 or 237 – Roman–Persian Wars
 Siege of Nisibis (252) – 252 – Roman–Persian Wars
 Siege of Antioch (253) – 253 – Roman–Persian Wars
 Battle of Edessa – 260 – Roman–Persian Wars
 Siege of Caesarea Cappadocia (260) – 260 – Roman–Persian Wars
 Siege of Tyana (272) – 272 – Palmyrene War
 Battle of Immae – 272 – Crisis of the Third Century
 Battle of Satala (298) – 298 – Roman–Persian Wars
 Battle of Tzirallum – 313 – Civil wars of the Tetrarchy
 Battle of Adrianople (324) – 324 – Civil wars of the Tetrarchy
 Battle of the Hellespont – 324 – Civil wars of the Tetrarchy
 Battle of Chrysopolis – 324 – Civil wars of the Tetrarchy
 Siege of Amida (359) – 359 – Perso-Roman wars of 337–361 (Roman–Persian Wars)
 Shapur II's siege of Bezabde – 360 – Perso-Roman wars of 337–361 (Roman–Persian Wars)
 Constantius II's siege of Bezabde – 360 – Perso-Roman wars of 337–361 (Roman–Persian Wars)
 Battle of Thyatira – 366 – Procopius's Rebellion
 Battle of Bagavan – 371
 Battle of Adrianople – 378 – Gothic War (376–382) (Fall of the Western Roman Empire) and Roman–Germanic wars
 Siege of Adrianople (378) – 378 – Gothic War (376–382) (Fall of the Western Roman Empire) and Roman–Germanic wars
 Battle of Constantinople (378) – 378 – Gothic War (376–382) (Fall of the Western Roman Empire) and Roman–Germanic wars
 Battle of Dara – 530 – Iberian War
 Battle of Satala (530) – 530 – Iberian War
 Siege of Martyropolis (531) – 531 – Iberian War
 Battle of Nisibis (541) – 541 – Belisarius invasion of Mesopotamia
 Siege of Nisibis (573) – 573 – Byzantine–Sasanian War of 572–591 (Roman–Persian Wars)
 Siege of Dara (573) – 573 – Byzantine–Sasanian War of 572–591 (Roman–Persian Wars)
 Battle of Solachon – 586 – Byzantine–Sasanian War of 572–591 (Roman–Persian Wars)
 Battle of Martyropolis (588) – 588 – Byzantine–Sasanian War of 572–591 (Roman–Persian Wars)
 Battle of Antioch (613) – 613 – Byzantine–Sasanian War of 602–628 (Roman–Persian Wars)
 Battle of Sarus – 625 – Byzantine–Sasanian War of 602–628 (Roman–Persian Wars)
 Siege of Constantinople (626) – 626 – Avar–Byzantine wars and Byzantine–Sasanian War of 602–628 (Roman–Persian Wars)
 Battle of the Iron Bridge – 637 – Muslim conquest of the Levant (Arab–Byzantine wars)
 Siege of Germanicia – 638 – Muslim conquest of the Levant (Arab–Byzantine wars)
 Battle of the Masts – 654 – Arab–Byzantine wars
 Siege of Constantinople (674–678) – 674 – 678 – Arab–Byzantine wars
 Battle of Sebastopolis – 692 – Arab–Byzantine wars
 Siege of Tyana – 707 – 708 or 708 – 709 – Arab–Byzantine wars
 Siege of Constantinople (717–718) – 717 – 718 – Arab–Byzantine wars
 Siege of Nicaea (727) – 727 – Arab–Byzantine wars
 Battle of Akroinon – 740 – Arab–Byzantine wars
 Siege of Kamacha – 766 – Arab–Byzantine wars
 Battle of Kopidnadon – 788 – Arab–Byzantine wars
 Battle of Krasos – 804 – Arab–Byzantine wars
 Siege of Adrianople (813) – 813 – Byzantine–Bulgarian wars
 Battle of Anzen – 838 – Arab–Byzantine wars
 Sack of Amorium – 838 – Arab–Byzantine wars
 Battle of Mauropotamos – 844 – Arab–Byzantine wars
 Siege of Constantinople (860) – 860 – Rus'–Byzantine War
 Capture of Faruriyyah – 862 – Arab–Byzantine wars
 Battle of Lalakaon – 863 – Arab–Byzantine wars
 Battle of Kardia – c. 872 or 873 – Arab–Byzantine wars
 Battle of Bathys Ryax – 872 or 878 – Arab–Byzantine wars
 Battle of Boulgarophygon – 896 – Byzantine–Bulgarian war of 894–896 (Byzantine–Bulgarian wars)
 Battle of Katasyrtai – 917 – Byzantine–Bulgarian war of 913–927 (Byzantine–Bulgarian wars)
 Battle of Pegae – 921 – Byzantine–Bulgarian war of 913–927 (Byzantine–Bulgarian wars)
 Battle of Constantinople (922) – Byzantine–Bulgarian war of 913–927 (Byzantine–Bulgarian wars)
 Battle of Marash (953) – 953 – Arab–Byzantine wars
 Battle of Raban – 958 – Arab–Byzantine wars
 Battle of Andrassos – 960 – Arab–Byzantine wars
 Byzantine conquest of Cilicia – 964 – 965 – Arab–Byzantine wars
 Siege of Antioch (968–969) – 968 – 969 – Arab–Byzantine wars
 Battle of Arcadiopolis (970) – 970 – Sviatoslav's invasion of Bulgaria (Byzantine–Bulgarian wars) and Hungarian invasions of Europe
 Battle of Alexandretta – 971 – Arab–Byzantine wars
 Battle of Kapetron – 1048 – Byzantine–Seljuk wars and Georgian–Seljuk wars
 Siege of Manzikert (1054) – 1054 – Byzantine–Seljuk wars
 Siege of Ani (1064) – 1064 – Byzantine–Seljuk wars
 Battle of Caesarea – 1067 – Byzantine–Seljuk wars
 Siege of Iconium (1069) – 1069 – Byzantine–Seljuk wars
 Battle of Manzikert – 1071 – Byzantine–Seljuk wars
 Siege of Xerigordos – 1096 – People's Crusade (First Crusade)
 Battle of Civetot – 1096 – People's Crusade (First Crusade)
 Siege of Nicaea – 1097 – Byzantine–Seljuk wars and First Crusade (Crusades)
 Battle of Dorylaeum (1097) – 1097 – First Crusade (Crusades)
 Siege of Antioch – 1097 – 1098 – First Crusade (Crusades)
 Battle of Antioch (1098) – 1098 – First Crusade (Crusades)
 Battle of Melitene – 1100 – Crusades
 Battle of Mersivan – 1101 – Byzantine–Seljuk wars and Crusade of 1101 (Crusades)
 Battle of Harran – 1104 – Crusades
 Battle of Artah – 1105 – Crusades
 Siege of Nicaea (1113) – 1113 – Byzantine–Seljuk wars
 Battle of Philomelion – 1116 – Byzantine–Seljuk wars
 Siege of Laodicea (1119) – 1119 – Byzantine–Seljuk wars
 Siege of Sozopolis – 1120 – Byzantine–Seljuk wars
 Siege of Edessa (1144) – 1144 – Crusades
 Fall of Saruj – 1145 – Crusades
 Siege of Edessa (1146) – 1146 – Crusades
 Battle of Constantinople (1147) – 1147 – Second Crusade (Crusades)
 Battle of Dorylaeum (1147) – 1147 – Second Crusade (Crusades)
 Battle of Ephesus (1147) – 1147 – Second Crusade (Crusades)
 Battle of the Meander – 1147 – Second Crusade (Crusades)
 Battle of Mount Cadmus – 1148 – Second Crusade (Crusades)
 Battle of Aintab – 1150 – Crusades
 Fall of Turbessel – 1151 – Byzantine–Seljuk wars
 Battle of Myriokephalon – 1176 – Byzantine–Seljuk wars
 Battle of Hyelion and Leimocheir – 1177 – Byzantine–Seljuk wars
 Siege of Claudiopolis – 1179 – Byzantine–Seljuk wars
 Battle of Philomelion (1190) – 1190 – Third Crusade (Crusades)
 Battle of Iconium (1190) – 1190 – Third Crusade (Crusades)
 Battle of Arcadiopolis (1194) – 1194 – Battles of the Second Bulgarian Empire (Byzantine–Bulgarian wars)
 Battle of Basian – 1202 – Georgian–Seljuk wars
 Siege of Constantinople (1203) – 1203 – Fourth Crusade (Crusades)
 Sack of Constantinople – 1204 – Fourth Crusade (Crusades)
 Battle of Adrianople (1205) – 1205 – Bulgarian–Latin wars
 Siege of Trebizond (1205–1206) – 1205 – 1206 – Byzantine–Seljuk wars
 Battle of Rusion – 1206 – Bulgarian–Latin wars
 Battle of Rodosto – 1206 – Bulgarian–Latin wars
 Siege of Antalya – 1207 – Byzantine–Seljuk wars
 Battle of Antioch on the Meander – 1211 – Byzantine–Seljuk wars
 Siege of Sinope – 1214 – Byzantine–Seljuk wars
 Siege of Alanya (1221) – 1221 – Byzantine–Seljuk wars
 Siege of Trebizond (1222–1223) – 1222 – 1223 – Byzantine–Seljuk wars
 Siege of Constantinople (1235) – 1235 – Bulgarian–Latin wars
 Battle of Köse Dağ – 1243 – Mongol invasions of Anatolia
 Battle of Adrianople (1254) – 1254 – Battles of the Second Bulgarian Empire (Byzantine–Bulgarian wars)
 Siege of Antioch (1268) – 1268 – Crusades
 Battle of Elbistan – 1277 – Mongol invasions of the Levant
 Siege of Kulaca Hisar – 1285 – Byzantine–Ottoman wars
 Battle of Bapheus – 1302 – Byzantine–Ottoman wars
 Battle of Dimbos – 1303 – Byzantine–Ottoman wars
 Battle of the Cyzicus – 1303 – Catalan campaign in Asia Minor (Catalan Company)
 Battle of Apros – 1305 – Catalan Company
 Siege of Bursa – 1317 – 1326 – Byzantine–Ottoman wars
 Siege of Nicaea (1328–1331) – 1328 – 1331 – Byzantine–Ottoman wars
 Battle of Pelekanon – 1329 – Byzantine–Ottoman wars
 Siege of Nicomedia – 1333 – 1337 – Byzantine–Ottoman wars
 Fall of Gallipoli – 1354 – Byzantine–Ottoman wars
 Ottoman conquest of Adrianople – 1362 or 1369 – Byzantine–Ottoman wars
 Battle of Sırpsındığı – 1364 – Serbian-Ottoman wars (Ottoman wars in Europe)
 Fall of Philadelphia – 1378 – 1390 – Byzantine–Ottoman wars
 Siege of Constantinople (1394–1402) – 1394 – 1402 – Byzantine–Ottoman wars
 Battle of Ankara or Battle of Angora – 1402 – Timurid conquests and invasions
 Siege of Smyrna – 1402 – Timurid conquests and invasions
 Siege of Constantinople (1411) – 1411 – Byzantine–Ottoman wars
 Battle of Gallipoli (1416) – 1416 – Ottoman–Venetian wars
 Siege of Constantinople (1422) – 1422 – Byzantine–Ottoman wars
 Fall of Constantinople – 1453 – Byzantine–Ottoman wars
 Siege of Trebizond (1461) – 1461 – Byzantine–Ottoman wars
 Battle of Chapakchur – 1467 – Qara Qoyunlu–Aq Qoyunlu Wars
 Battle of Otlukbeli – 1473 – Ottoman-Aq Qoyunlu wars
 Battle of Erzincan (1507) – 1507 – Ottoman–Persian Wars
 Capture of Bayburt (1514) – 1514 – Ottoman–Persian Wars
 Battle of Tekiryaylağı – 1515 – Ottoman–Persian Wars
 Siege of Harput (1516) – 1516 – Ottoman–Persian Wars
 Battle of Koçhisar – 1516 – Ottoman–Persian Wars
 Battle of Çıldır – 1578 – Ottoman–Safavid War (1578–1590) (Ottoman–Persian Wars)
 Action of 26 May 1646 – 1646 – Cretan War (1645–1669) (Ottoman–Venetian wars)
 Battle of Focchies – 1649 – Cretan War (1645–1669) (Ottoman–Venetian wars)
 Battle of the Dardanelles (1654) – 1654 – Cretan War (1645–1669) (Ottoman–Venetian wars)
 Battle of the Dardanelles (1655) – 1655 – Cretan War (1645–1669) (Ottoman–Venetian wars)
 Battle of the Dardanelles (1656) – 1656 – Cretan War (1645–1669) (Ottoman–Venetian wars)
 Battle of the Dardanelles (1657) – 1657 – Cretan War (1645–1669) (Ottoman–Venetian wars)
 Battle of Imbros (1717) – 1717 – Ottoman–Venetian War (1714–1718)
 Dardanelles operation – 1807 – Anglo-Turkish War (1807–1809)
 Battle of the Dardanelles (1807) – 1807 – Russo-Turkish War (1806–1812)
 Battle of Erzurum (1821) – 1821 – Ottoman–Persian War (1821–1823)
 Siege of Kars (1828) – 1828 – Russo-Turkish War (1828–1829)
 Battle of Konya – 1832 – Egyptian–Ottoman War (1831–1833)
 Battle of Nezib – 1839 – Egyptian–Ottoman War (1839–1841)

Turkmenistan 

 Battle of Oxus River – 651 – Muslim conquest of Khorasan (Muslim conquest of Persia)
 Battle of Dandanaqan – 1040 – Seljuk-Ghaznavid Wars
 Siege of Gurganj – 1221 – Mongol invasion of the Khwarazmian Empire
 Battle of Marv or Battle of Merv – 1510 – Persian–Uzbek wars

Ukraine
 Battle of Lake Maeotis – 309 BC – Bosporan Civil War
 Battle of Southern Buh – 896 – Byzantine–Bulgarian war of 894–896 (Byzantine–Bulgarian wars)
 Siege of Kiev (968) – 968
 Battle of the Alta River – 1068
 Battle of the Stuhna River – 1093
 Battle of Sudak – 1221 or 1222 – Byzantine–Seljuk wars
 Battle of the Kalka River – 1223 – Mongol invasion of Kievan Rus'
 Sack of Chernigov – 1239 – Mongol invasion of Kievan Rus'
 Siege of Kiev (1240) – 1240 – Mongol invasion of Kievan Rus'
 Battle of Blue Waters – 1362 – Conflicts in Eastern Europe during Turco-Mongol rule
 Battle of the Vorskla River – 1399 – Conflicts in Eastern Europe during Turco-Mongol rule
 Battle of Cătlăbuga – 1485 – Moldavian–Ottoman Wars (Ottoman wars in Europe)
 Battle of Novhorod-Siverskyi – 1604 – Time of Troubles (False Dmitry I)
 Battle of Khotyn (1621) – 1621 – Polish–Ottoman War (1620–1621) (Polish–Ottoman Wars)
 Battle of Ochmatów (1644) – 1644
 Battle of Zhovti Vody – 1648 – Khmelnytsky Uprising (Deluge (history))
 Battle of Korsuń – 1648 – Khmelnytsky Uprising (Deluge (history))
 Battle of Starokostiantyniv – 1648 – Khmelnytsky Uprising (Deluge (history))
 Battle of Pyliavtsi – 1648 – Khmelnytsky Uprising (Deluge (history))
 Siege of Zbarazh – 1649 – Khmelnytsky Uprising (Deluge (history))
 Battle of Zboriv (1649) – 1649 – Khmelnytsky Uprising (Deluge (history))
 Battle of Krasne – 1651 – Khmelnytsky Uprising (Deluge (history))
 Battle of Kopychyntsi – 1651 – Khmelnytsky Uprising (Deluge (history))
 Battle of Berestechko – 1651 – Khmelnytsky Uprising (Deluge (history))
 Battle of Bila Tserkva (1651) – 1651 – Khmelnytsky Uprising (Deluge (history))
 Battle of Batoh – 1652 – Khmelnytsky Uprising (Deluge (history))
 Battle of Zhvanets – 1653 – Khmelnytsky Uprising (Deluge (history))
 Battle of Okhmativ (1655) – 1655 – Russo-Polish War (1654–1667) (Polish-Russian Wars)
 Battle of Horodok (1655) – 1655 – Russo-Polish War (1654–1667) (Polish-Russian Wars)
 Battle of Magierów – 1657 – Deluge (history) and Second Northern War (Northern Wars)
 Battle of Czarny Ostrów – 1657 – Deluge (history) and Second Northern War (Northern Wars)
 Battle of Skałat – 1657 – Deluge (history) and Second Northern War (Northern Wars)
 Battle of Konotop (1659) – 1659 – Russo-Polish War (1654–1667) (Polish-Russian Wars)
 Battle of Lyubar – 1660 – Russo-Polish War (1654–1667) (Polish-Russian Wars)
 Battle of Slobodyshche – 1660 – Russo-Polish War (1654–1667) (Polish-Russian Wars)
 Battle of Chudnov – 1660 – Russo-Polish War (1654–1667) (Polish-Russian Wars)
 Siege of Hlukhiv – 1664 – Russo-Polish War (1654–1667) (Polish-Russian Wars)
 Battle of Stavishche – 1664 – Russo-Polish War (1654–1667) (Polish-Russian Wars)
 Battle of Podhajce (1667) – 1667 – Polish–Cossack–Tatar War (1666–1671)
 Battle of Ładyżyn – 1672 – Polish–Ottoman War (1672–1676) (Polish–Ottoman Wars)
 Siege of Kamenets – 1672 – Polish–Ottoman War (1672–1676) (Polish–Ottoman Wars)
 Battle of Niemirów – 1672 – Polish–Ottoman War (1672–1676) (Polish–Ottoman Wars)
 Battle of Komarno – 1672 – Polish–Ottoman War (1672–1676) (Polish–Ottoman Wars)
 Battle of Khotyn (1673) – 1673 – Polish–Ottoman War (1672–1676) (Polish–Ottoman Wars)
 Battle of Lwów (1675) – 1675 – Polish–Ottoman War (1672–1676) (Polish–Ottoman Wars)
 Battle of Trembowla – 1675 – Polish–Ottoman War (1672–1676) (Polish–Ottoman Wars)
 Battle of Żurawno – 1676 – Polish–Ottoman War (1672–1676) (Polish–Ottoman Wars)
 Battle of Hodów – 1694 – Polish–Ottoman War (1683–1699) (Great Turkish War)
 Battle of Ustechko – 1694 – Polish–Ottoman War (1683–1699) (Great Turkish War)
 Battle of Podhajce (1698) – 1698 – Polish–Ottoman War (1683–1699) (Great Turkish War)
 Battle of Lemberg (1704) – 1704 – Swedish invasion of Poland (1701–1706) (Great Northern War) [Northern Wars]
 Battle of Desna – 1708 – Swedish invasion of Russia (Great Northern War) [Northern Wars]
 Sack of Baturyn – 1708 – Swedish invasion of Russia (Great Northern War) [Northern Wars]
 Siege of Veprik – 1709 – Swedish invasion of Russia (Great Northern War) [Northern Wars]
 Battle of Oposhnya – 1709 – Swedish invasion of Russia (Great Northern War) [Northern Wars]
 Battle of Krasnokutsk–Gorodnoye – 1709 – Swedish invasion of Russia (Great Northern War) [Northern Wars]
 Battle of Sokolki – 1709 – Swedish invasion of Russia (Great Northern War) [Northern Wars]
 Battle of Poltava – 1709 – Swedish invasion of Russia (Great Northern War) [Northern Wars]
 Surrender at Perevolochna – 1709 – Swedish invasion of Russia (Great Northern War) [Northern Wars]
 Siege of Perekop (1736) – 1736 – Russo-Turkish War (1735–1739)
 Siege of Ochakov (1737) – 1737 – Russo-Turkish War (1735–1739)
 Battle of Stavuchany – 1739 – Russo-Turkish War (1735–1739)
 Siege of Bar – 1768 – Bar Confederation
 Battle of Kerch Strait (1774) – 1774 – Russo-Turkish War (1768–1774)
 Battle of Kinburn (1787) – 1787 – Russo-Turkish War (1787–1792)
 Siege of Ochakov (1788) – 1788 – Russo-Turkish War (1787–1792)
 Naval actions at the siege of Ochakov (1788) – 1788 – Russo-Turkish War (1787–1792)
 Siege of Khotin (1788) – 1788 – Russo-Turkish War (1787–1792)
 Battle of Fidonisi – 1788 – Russo-Turkish War (1787–1792)
 Battle of Kerch Strait (1790) – 1790 – Russo-Turkish War (1787–1792)
 Battle of Tendra – 1790 – Russo-Turkish War (1787–1792)
 Siege of Izmail – 1790 – Russo-Turkish War (1787–1792)
 Battle of Boruszkowce – 1792 – Polish–Russian War of 1792
 Battle of Zieleńce – 1792 – Polish–Russian War of 1792
 Battle of Poryck – 1831 – November Uprising
 Battle of Alma – 1854
 Battle of Balaclava – 1854
 Battle of Inkerman – 1854
 Battle of Malakoff – 1855
 Brusilov Offensive – 1916
 Battle of Zborov – 1917
 Battle of Bakhmach – 1918
 Battle of Borodozianka – 1920
 Siege of Odessa – 1941
 First Battle of Kharkov – 1941
 Battle of Sevastopol – 1941–1942
 Second Battle of Kharkov – 1942
 Third Battle of Kharkov – 1943 – Last major Axis victory in east front
 Fourth Battle of Kharkov – 1943 – Red army recover Kharkov definitely
 Battle of Kyiv - 2022
 Battle of Kharkiv – 2022 – Ongoing engagement during the 2022 Russian invasion of Ukraine

United Arab Emirates 

 Battle of Dibba – c. between 632 and 634 – Ridda Wars
 Battle of the Strait of Hormuz (1553) – 1553 – Ottoman campaign against Hormuz (Ottoman–Portuguese conflicts (1538–1559)) [Ottoman–Portuguese confrontations]
 Battle of the Gulf of Oman – 1554 – Ottoman campaign against Hormuz (Ottoman–Portuguese conflicts (1538–1559)) [Ottoman–Portuguese confrontations]
 Battle off Hormuz (1625) – 1625 – Dutch–Portuguese War

United Kingdom
See England, Ireland, Scotland and Wales within this article.

 Battle of Ronaldsway – 1275 – Manx revolt of 1275
 First siege of Gibraltar – 1309 – Reconquista
 Second siege of Gibraltar – 1316 – 1317 – Reconquista
 Third siege of Gibraltar – 1333 – Reconquista
 Fourth siege of Gibraltar – 1333 – Reconquista
 Fifth siege of Gibraltar – 1349 – 1350 – Reconquista
 Sixth siege of Gibraltar – 1411 – Reconquista
 Seventh siege of Gibraltar – 1436 – Reconquista
 Eighth siege of Gibraltar – 1462 – Reconquista
 Ninth siege of Gibraltar – 1466 – 1467 – Reconquista
 Action off Bermuda (1585) – 1585 – Anglo-Spanish War (1585–1604)
 Battle of Gibraltar (1607) – 1607 – Eighty Years' War, 1599–1609 (Eighty Years' War) [European wars of religion]
 Battle of Gibraltar (1618) – 1618 – Eighty Years' War (European wars of religion)
 Battle of Gibraltar (1621) – 1621 – Eighty Years' War, 1621–1648 (Eighty Years' War and Thirty Years' War) [European wars of religion]
 Dutch invasion of Saint Helena – 1673 – Third Anglo-Dutch War (Franco-Dutch War and Anglo-Dutch Wars)
 Capture of Gibraltar – 1704 – War of the Spanish Succession
 Twelfth siege of Gibraltar – 1704 – 1705 – War of the Spanish Succession
 Thirteenth siege of Gibraltar – 1727 – Anglo-Spanish War (1727–1729)
 Battle of Bishops Court – 1760 – Planned French invasion of Britain (1759) (Seven Years' War)
 North Channel Naval Duel – 1778 – American Revolutionary War
 Invasion of Jersey (1779) – 1779 – American Revolutionary War
 Great Siege of Gibraltar – 1779 – 1783 – American Revolutionary War
 Action of 30 September 1780 – 1780 – American Revolutionary War
 Battle of Jersey – 1781 – American Revolutionary War
 Action of 4 February 1781 – 1781 – Fourth Anglo-Dutch War (American Revolutionary War)
 Battle of Dogger Bank (1781) – 1781 – Fourth Anglo-Dutch War (American Revolutionary War)
 Capture of Montserrat – 1782 – American Revolutionary War
 Battle of Grand Turk – 1783 – American Revolutionary War
 Action of 19 January 1799 – 1799 – Anglo-Spanish War (1796–1808) (French Revolutionary and Napoleonic Wars)
 Action of 7 July 1799 – 1799 – Anglo-Spanish War (1796–1808) (French Revolutionary and Napoleonic Wars)
 Action of 10 December 1800 – 1800 – Anglo-Spanish War (1796–1808) (French Revolutionary and Napoleonic Wars)
 First Battle of Algeciras – 1801 – Anglo-Spanish War (1796–1808) and War of the Second Coalition (French Revolutionary and Napoleonic Wars)
 Second Battle of Algeciras – 1801 – Anglo-Spanish War (1796–1808) and War of the Second Coalition (French Revolutionary and Napoleonic Wars)

United States

 Raid on St. Augustine – 1586 – Anglo-Spanish War (1585–1604)
 Battle of San Juan (1595) – 1595 – Anglo-Spanish War (1585–1604)
 Battle of San Juan (1598) – 1598 – Anglo-Spanish War (1585–1604)
 Battle of San Juan (1625) – 1625 – Eighty Years' War, 1621–1648 (Eighty Years' War and Thirty Years' War) [European wars of religion]
 Mystic massacre – 1637 – Pequot War
 Fairfield Swamp Fight – 1637 – Pequot War
 Wheeler's Surprise – 1675 – King Philip's War (American Indian Wars)
 Battle of Bloody Brook – 1675 – King Philip's War (American Indian Wars)
 Siege of Springfield – 1675 – King Philip's War (American Indian Wars)
 Great Swamp Fight – 1675 – King Philip's War (American Indian Wars)
 Lancaster raid – 1676 – King Philip's War (American Indian Wars)
 Sudbury Fight – 1676 – King Philip's War (American Indian Wars)
 Battle of Turner's Falls – 1676 – King Philip's War (American Indian Wars)
 Second Battle of Nipsachuck Battlefield – 1676 – King Philip's War (American Indian Wars)
 Raid on Dover – 1689 – King William's War (Nine Years' War)
 Siege of Pemaquid (1689) – 1689 – King William's War (Nine Years' War)
 Schenectady massacre – 1690 – King William's War (Nine Years' War)
 Raid on Salmon Falls – 1690 – King William's War (Nine Years' War)
 Battle of Falmouth (1690) – 1690 – King William's War (Nine Years' War)
 Raid on York (1692) – 1692 – King William's War (Nine Years' War)
 Raid on Wells (1692) – 1692 – King William's War (Nine Years' War)
 Battle of Wilton (New York) – 1693 – King William's War (Nine Years' War)
 Raid on Oyster River – 1694 – King William's War (Nine Years' War)
 Raid on Groton – 1694 – King William's War (Nine Years' War)
 Siege of Pemaquid (1696) – 1696 – King William's War (Nine Years' War)
 Raid on Haverhill (1697) – 1697 – King William's War (Nine Years' War)
 Battle of Flint River – 1702 – Queen Anne's War (War of the Spanish Succession and American Indian Wars)
 Siege of St. Augustine (1702) – 1702 – Queen Anne's War (War of the Spanish Succession and American Indian Wars)
 Battle of Falmouth (1703) – 1703 – Queen Anne's War (War of the Spanish Succession and American Indian Wars)
 Battle of Ayubale – 1704 – Queen Anne's War (War of the Spanish Succession and American Indian Wars)
 Raid on Deerfield – 1704 – Queen Anne's War (War of the Spanish Succession and American Indian Wars)
 Lefebvre's Charles Town expedition – 1706 – Queen Anne's War (War of the Spanish Succession and American Indian Wars)
 Siege of Pensacola (1707) – 1707 – Queen Anne's War (War of the Spanish Succession and American Indian Wars)
 Raid on Haverhill (1708) – 1708 – Queen Anne's War (War of the Spanish Succession and American Indian Wars)
 Siege of Fort Neoheroka – 1713 – Tuscarora War (American Indian Wars)
 Capture of Pensacola (1719) – 1719 – War of the Quadruple Alliance
 Battle of Norridgewock – 1724 – Dummer's War (American Indian Wars)
 Raid at Lake Winnipesaukee – 1724 – Dummer's War (American Indian Wars)
 Raid on Wakefield – 1725 – Dummer's War (American Indian Wars)
 Battle of Pequawket – 1725 – Dummer's War (American Indian Wars)
 Battle of Ogoula Tchetoka – 1736 – Chickasaw Campaign of 1736 (Chickasaw Wars) [American Indian Wars]
 Battle of Ackia – 1736 – Chickasaw Campaign of 1736 (Chickasaw Wars) [American Indian Wars]
 Siege of St. Augustine (1740) – 1740 – War of Jenkins' Ear (War of the Austrian Succession)
 Siege of Fort Mose – 1740 – War of Jenkins' Ear (War of the Austrian Succession)
 Battle of Bloody Marsh – 1742 – Invasion of Georgia (1742) (War of Jenkins' Ear) [War of the Austrian Succession]
 Battle of Gully Hole Creek – 1742 – Invasion of Georgia (1742) (War of Jenkins' Ear) [War of the Austrian Succession]
 Raid on Saratoga – 1745 – King George's War (War of the Austrian Succession)
 Siege of Fort Massachusetts – 1746 – King George's War (War of the Austrian Succession)
 Siege of Fort at Number 4 – 1747 – King George's War (War of the Austrian Succession)
 Raid on Brunswick Town – 1748 – War of Jenkins' Ear (War of the Austrian Succession)
 Battle of Jumonville Glen – 1754 – French and Indian War (Seven Years' War and Sixty Years' War)
 Battle of Fort Necessity – 1754 – French and Indian War (Seven Years' War and Sixty Years' War)
 Battle of the Monongahela – 1755 – French and Indian War (Seven Years' War and Sixty Years' War)
 Battle of Lake George – 1755 – French and Indian War (Seven Years' War and Sixty Years' War)
 Penn's Creek massacre – 1755 – French and Indian War (Seven Years' War and Sixty Years' War)
 Battle of Fort Bull – 1756 – French and Indian War (Seven Years' War and Sixty Years' War)
 Battle of the Trough – 1756 – French and Indian War (Seven Years' War and Sixty Years' War)
 Battle of Sideling Hill – 1756 – French and Indian War (Seven Years' War and Sixty Years' War)
 Battle of Great Cacapon – 1756 – French and Indian War (Seven Years' War and Sixty Years' War)
 Battle of Fort Oswego – 1756 – French and Indian War (Seven Years' War and Sixty Years' War)
 Battle of Kittanning – 1756 – French and Indian War (Seven Years' War and Sixty Years' War)
 Bloody Springs massacre – 1757 – French and Indian War (Seven Years' War and Sixty Years' War)
 Battle on Snowshoes (1757) – 1757 – French and Indian War (Seven Years' War and Sixty Years' War)
 Battle of Sabbath Day Point – 1757 – French and Indian War (Seven Years' War and Sixty Years' War)
 Siege of Fort William Henry – 1757 – French and Indian War (Seven Years' War and Sixty Years' War)
 Attack on German Flatts (1757) – 1757 – French and Indian War (Seven Years' War and Sixty Years' War)
 Battle on Snowshoes – 1758 – French and Indian War (Seven Years' War and Sixty Years' War)
 Battle of Carillon – 1758 – French and Indian War (Seven Years' War and Sixty Years' War)
 Battle of Fort Duquesne – 1758 – French and Indian War (Seven Years' War and Sixty Years' War)
 Battle of Fort Ligonier – 1758 – French and Indian War (Seven Years' War and Sixty Years' War)
 Battle of Fort Niagara – 1759 – Conquest of New France (1758–1760) (French and Indian War) [Seven Years' War and Sixty Years' War]
 Battle of La Belle-Famille – 1759 – Conquest of New France (1758–1760) (French and Indian War) [Seven Years' War and Sixty Years' War]
 Battle of Ticonderoga (1759) – 1759 – Conquest of New France (1758–1760) (French and Indian War) [Seven Years' War and Sixty Years' War]
 Siege of Fort Loudoun – 1760 – Anglo-Cherokee War (French and Indian War) [Seven Years' War and Sixty Years' War]
 Battle of Fort Dobbs – 1760 – Anglo-Cherokee War (French and Indian War) [Seven Years' War and Sixty Years' War]
 Battle of Fort Prince George – 1760 – Anglo-Cherokee War (French and Indian War) [Seven Years' War and Sixty Years' War]
 Battle of Echoee – 1760 – Anglo-Cherokee War (French and Indian War) [Seven Years' War and Sixty Years' War]
 Battle of the Thousand Islands – 1760 – Conquest of New France (1758–1760) (French and Indian War) [Seven Years' War and Sixty Years' War]
 Siege of Fort Detroit – 1763 – Pontiac's War (American Indian Wars)
 Siege of Fort Pitt – 1763 – Pontiac's War (American Indian Wars)
 Battle of Bloody Run – 1763 – Pontiac's War (American Indian Wars)
 Battle of Bushy Run – 1763 – Pontiac's War (American Indian Wars)
 Battle of Devil's Hole – 1763 – Pontiac's War (American Indian Wars)
 Enoch Brown school massacre – 1764 – Pontiac's War (American Indian Wars)
 Battle at the Yadkin River – 1771 – Regulator Movement
 Battle of Alamance – 1771 – Regulator Movement
 Battles of Lexington and Concord – 1775 – American Revolutionary War
 Siege of Boston – 1775 – 1776 – American Revolutionary War
 Battle of Menotomy – 1775 – American Revolutionary War
 Capture of Fort Ticonderoga – 1775 – American Revolutionary War
 Battle off Fairhaven – 1775 – American Revolutionary War
 Battle of Chelsea Creek – 1775 – American Revolutionary War
 Battle of Machias – 1775 – American Revolutionary War
 Battle of Bunker Hill – 1775 – American Revolutionary War
 Battle of Gloucester (1775) – 1775 – American Revolutionary War
 Burning of Falmouth – 1775 – American Revolutionary War
 Battle of Kemp's Landing – 1775 – American Revolutionary War
 Siege of Savage's Old Fields – 1775 – American Revolutionary War
 Battle of Great Bridge – 1775 – American Revolutionary War
 Battle of Great Cane Brake – 1775 – American Revolutionary War
 Burning of Norfolk – 1776 – American Revolutionary War
 Battle of Moore's Creek Bridge – 1776 – American Revolutionary War
 Battle of the Rice Boats – 1776 – American Revolutionary War
 Battle of Block Island – 1776 – American Revolutionary War
 Battle of Sullivan's Island – 1776 – American Revolutionary War
 Battle of Turtle Gut Inlet – 1776 – American Revolutionary War
 Battle of Gwynn's Island – 1776 – American Revolutionary War
 Battle of Lindley's Fort – 1776 – American Revolutionary War
 Battle of Long Island – 1776 – American Revolutionary War
 Landing at Kip's Bay – 1776 – American Revolutionary War
 Battle of Harlem Heights – 1776 – American Revolutionary War
 Battle of Valcour Island – 1776 – American Revolutionary War
 Battle of Pell's Point – 1776 – American Revolutionary War
 Battle of Mamaroneck – 1776 – American Revolutionary War
 Battle of White Plains – 1776 – American Revolutionary War
 Battle of Fort Washington – 1776 – American Revolutionary War
 Battle of Fort Lee – 1776 – American Revolutionary War
 Ambush of Geary – 1776 – American Revolutionary War
 Battle of Iron Works Hill – 1776 – American Revolutionary War
 Battle of Trenton – 1776 – American Revolutionary War
 Battle of the Assunpink Creek – 1777 – American Revolutionary War
 Battle of Princeton – 1777 – American Revolutionary War
 Battle of Millstone – 1777 – American Revolutionary War
 Battle of Bound Brook – 1777 – American Revolutionary War
 Battle of Ridgefield – 1777 – American Revolutionary War
 Battle of Thomas Creek – 1777 – American Revolutionary War
 Meigs Raid – 1777 – American Revolutionary War
 Battle of Short Hills – 1777 – American Revolutionary War
 Siege of Fort Ticonderoga (1777) – 1777 – American Revolutionary War
 Battle of Hubbardton – 1777 – American Revolutionary War
 Battle of Fort Anne – 1777 – American Revolutionary War
 Siege of Fort Stanwix – 1777 – American Revolutionary War
 Battle of Oriskany – 1777 – American Revolutionary War
 Battle of Machias (1777) – 1777 – American Revolutionary War
 Battle of Bennington – 1777 – American Revolutionary War
 Battle of Staten Island – 1777 – American Revolutionary War
 Battle of Setauket – 1777 – American Revolutionary War
 Siege of Fort Henry (1777) – 1777 – American Revolutionary War
 Battle of Cooch's Bridge – 1777 – American Revolutionary War
 Battle of Brandywine – 1777 – American Revolutionary War
 Battle of the Clouds – 1777 – American Revolutionary War
 Battles of Saratoga – 1777 – American Revolutionary War
 Battle of Forts Clinton and Montgomery – 1777 – American Revolutionary War
 Battle of Paoli – 1777 – American Revolutionary War
 Siege of Fort Mifflin – 1777 – American Revolutionary War
 Battle of Germantown – 1777 – American Revolutionary War
 Burning of Kingston – 1777 – American Revolutionary War
 Battle of Red Bank – 1777 – American Revolutionary War
 Battle of Gloucester (1777) – 1777 – American Revolutionary War
 Battle of White Marsh – 1777 – American Revolutionary War
 Battle of Matson's Ford – 1777 – American Revolutionary War
 Battle of Quinton's Bridge – 1778 – American Revolutionary War
 Frederica naval action – 1778 – American Revolutionary War
 Battle of Crooked Billet – 1778 – American Revolutionary War
 Battle of Barren Hill – 1778 – American Revolutionary War
 Mount Hope Bay raids – 1778 – American Revolutionary War
 Battle of Cobleskill – 1778 – American Revolutionary War
 Battle of Monmouth – 1778 – American Revolutionary War
 Battle of Alligator Creek Bridge – 1778 – American Revolutionary War
 Battle of Wyoming – 1778 – American Revolutionary War
 Battle of Rhode Island – 1778 – American Revolutionary War
 Grey's raid – 1778 – American Revolutionary War
 Siege of Boonesborough – 1778 – American Revolutionary War
 Attack on German Flatts (1778) – 1778 – American Revolutionary War
 Baylor Massacre – 1778 – American Revolutionary War
 Battle of Edgar's Lane – 1778 – American Revolutionary War
 Battle of Chestnut Neck – 1778 – American Revolutionary War
 Raid on Unadilla and Onaquaga – 1778 – American Revolutionary War
 Affair at Little Egg Harbor – 1778 – American Revolutionary War
 Carleton's Raid – 1778 – American Revolutionary War
 Cherry Valley massacre – 1778 – American Revolutionary War
 Capture of Savannah – 1778 – American Revolutionary War
 Battle of Beaufort – 1779 – American Revolutionary War
 Battle of Van Creek – 1779 – American Revolutionary War
 Battle of Kettle Creek – 1779 – American Revolutionary War
 Siege of Fort Laurens – 1779 – American Revolutionary War
 Siege of Fort Vincennes – 1779 – American Revolutionary War
 Battle of Brier Creek – 1779 – American Revolutionary War
 Battle of Chillicothe – 1779 – American Revolutionary War
 Battle of Stono Ferry – 1779 – American Revolutionary War
 Burning of Fairfield (1779) – 1779 – Tryon's raid (American Revolutionary War)
 Battle of Norwalk – 1779 – Tryon's raid (American Revolutionary War)
 Battle of Stony Point – 1779 – American Revolutionary War
 Battle of Minisink – 1779 – American Revolutionary War
 Battle of Paulus Hook – 1779 – American Revolutionary War
 Battle of Newtown – 1779 – American Revolutionary War
 Capture of Fort Bute – 1779 – American Revolutionary War
 Battle of Lake Pontchartrain – 1779 – American Revolutionary War
 Action of 11 September 1779 – 1779 – American Revolutionary War
 Battle of Baton Rouge (1779) – 1779 – American Revolutionary War
 Boyd and Parker ambush – 1779 – American Revolutionary War
 Siege of Savannah – 1779 – American Revolutionary War
 Battle of Young's House – 1780 – American Revolutionary War
 Battle of Fort Charlotte – 1780 – American Revolutionary War
 Siege of Charleston – 1780 – American Revolutionary War
 Battle of Monck's Corner – 1780 – American Revolutionary War
 Battle of Lenud's Ferry – 1780 – American Revolutionary War
 Battle of St. Louis – 1780 – American Revolutionary War
 Battle of Waxhaws – 1780 – American Revolutionary War
 Battle of Connecticut Farms – 1780 – American Revolutionary War
 Action of 7 June 1780 – 1780 – American Revolutionary War
 Battle of Mobley's Meeting House – 1780 – American Revolutionary War
 Battle of Ramsour's Mill – 1780 – American Revolutionary War
 Battle of Springfield – 1780 – American Revolutionary War
 Huck's Defeat – 1780 – American Revolutionary War
 Battle of Bull's Ferry – 1780 – American Revolutionary War
 Battle of Colson's Mill – 1780 – American Revolutionary War
 Battle of Rocky Mount – 1780 – American Revolutionary War
 Battle of Hanging Rock – 1780 – American Revolutionary War
 Battle of Piqua – 1780 – American Revolutionary War
 Battle of Camden – 1780 – American Revolutionary War
 Battle of Fishing Creek – 1780 – American Revolutionary War
 Battle of Musgrove Mill – 1780 – American Revolutionary War
 Battle of Black Mingo – 1780 – American Revolutionary War
 Battle of Wahab's Plantation – 1780 – American Revolutionary War
 Battle of Charlotte – 1780 – American Revolutionary War
 Battle of Kings Mountain – 1780 – American Revolutionary War
 Battle of Shallow Ford – 1780 – American Revolutionary War
 Royalton raid – 1780 – American Revolutionary War
 Battle of Klock's Field – 1780 – American Revolutionary War
 Battle of Tearcoat Swamp – 1780 – American Revolutionary War
 La Balme's Defeat – 1780 – American Revolutionary War
 Battle of Fishdam Ford – 1780 – American Revolutionary War
 Battle of Blackstock's Farm – 1780 – American Revolutionary War
 Battle of Fort St. George – 1780 – American Revolutionary War
 Raid on Richmond – 1781 – American Revolutionary War
 Battle of Mobile (1781) – 1781 – American Revolutionary War
 Battle of Cowpens – 1781 – American Revolutionary War
 Battle of Cowan's Ford – 1781 – American Revolutionary War
 Battle of Torrence's Tavern – 1781 – American Revolutionary War
 Pyle's Massacre – 1781 – American Revolutionary War
 Battle of Wetzell's Mill – 1781 – American Revolutionary War
 Skirmish at Waters Creek – 1781 – American Revolutionary War
 Siege of Pensacola – 1781 – American Revolutionary War
 Battle of Guilford Court House – 1781 – American Revolutionary War
 Battle of Cape Henry – 1781 – American Revolutionary War
 Siege of Fort Watson – 1781 – American Revolutionary War
 Battle of Blandford – 1781 – American Revolutionary War
 Battle of Hobkirk's Hill – 1781 – American Revolutionary War
 Siege of Fort Motte – 1781 – American Revolutionary War
 Battle of Pine's Bridge – 1781 – American Revolutionary War
 Siege of Augusta – 1781 – American Revolutionary War
 Siege of Ninety-Six – 1781 – American Revolutionary War
 Battle of Spencer's Ordinary – 1781 – American Revolutionary War
 Battle of Green Spring – 1781 – American Revolutionary War
 Francisco's Fight – 1781 – American Revolutionary War
 Battle of the House in the Horseshoe – 1781 – American Revolutionary War
 Lochry's Defeat – 1781 – American Revolutionary War
 Action of 2 September 1781 – 1781 – American Revolutionary War
 Battle of the Chesapeake – 1781 – American Revolutionary War
 Battle of Groton Heights – 1781 – American Revolutionary War
 Capture of HMS Savage – 1781 – American Revolutionary War
 Battle of Eutaw Springs – 1781 – American Revolutionary War
 Battle of Lindley's Mill – 1781 – American Revolutionary War
 Long Run massacre – 1781 – American Revolutionary War
 Siege of Yorktown – 1781 – American Revolutionary War
 Battle of Fort Slongo – 1781 – American Revolutionary War
 Battle of Johnstown – 1781 – American Revolutionary War
 Battle of Videau's Bridge – 1782 – American Revolutionary War
 Battle of Wambaw – 1782 – American Revolutionary War
 Gnadenhutten massacre – 1782 – American Revolutionary War
 Battle of Little Mountain – 1782 – American Revolutionary War
 Battle of Delaware Bay – 1782 – American Revolutionary War
 Battle of the Mona Passage – 1782 – American Revolutionary War
 Battle of Mokuohai – 1782 – Unification of Hawaii
 Action of 29 July 1782 – 1782 – American Revolutionary War
 Siege of Bryan Station – 1782 – American Revolutionary War
 Battle of Blue Licks – 1782 – American Revolutionary War
 Battle of the Combahee River – 1782 – American Revolutionary War
 Action of 5 September 1782 – 1782 – American Revolutionary War
 Siege of Fort Henry (1782) – 1782 – American Revolutionary War
 Action of 15 September 1782 – 1782 – American Revolutionary War
 Battle of James Island – 1782 – American Revolutionary War
 Battle of Kedges Strait – 1782 – American Revolutionary War
 Battle of the Delaware Capes – 1782 – American Revolutionary War
 Action of 22 January 1783 – 1783 – American Revolutionary War
 Battle of Arkansas Post (1783) – 1783 – American Revolutionary War
 Skirmishes around Vincennes (1786) – 1786 – Northwest Indian War (American Indian Wars)
 Logan's raid – 1786 – Northwest Indian War (American Indian Wars)
 Battle of Kepaniwai – 1790 – Unification of Hawaii
 1790 Footprints – 1790 – Unification of Hawaii
 Big Bottom massacre – 1791 – Northwest Indian War (American Indian Wars)
 Siege of Dunlap's Station – 1791 – Northwest Indian War (American Indian Wars)
 Battle of Kenapacomaqua – 1791 – Northwest Indian War (American Indian Wars)
 St. Clair's defeat – 1791 – Northwest Indian War (American Indian Wars)
 Battle of Kawaihae – 1791 – Unification of Hawaii
 Battle of Fort Recovery – 1794 – Northwest Indian War (American Indian Wars)
 Battle of Fallen Timbers – 1794 – Northwest Indian War (American Indian Wars)
 Battle of Nuʻuanu – 1795 – Unification of Hawaii
 Battle of San Juan (1797) – 1797 – Anglo-Spanish War (1796–1808) (French Revolutionary and Napoleonic Wars)
 Capture of La Croyable – 1798 – Quasi-War (French Revolutionary Wars)
 Battle of Sitka – 1804 – Russian colonization of North America and American Indian Wars
 Battle of Tippecanoe – 1811 – Tecumseh's War (War of 1812 and American Indian Wars)
 Siege of Fort Mackinac – 1812 – War of 1812 (Sixty Years' War)
 First Battle of Sacket's Harbor – 1812 – War of 1812 (Sixty Years' War)
 Battle of Brownstown – 1812 – War of 1812 (Sixty Years' War)
 Battle of Maguaga – 1812 – War of 1812 (Sixty Years' War)
 Battle of Fort Dearborn – 1812 – War of 1812 (Sixty Years' War)
 Siege of Detroit – 1812 – War of 1812 (Sixty Years' War)
 Battle of Credit Island – 1812 – War of 1812 (Sixty Years' War)
 Siege of Fort Harrison – 1812 – War of 1812 (Sixty Years' War)
 Siege of Fort Wayne – 1812 – War of 1812 (Sixty Years' War)
 Copus massacre – 1812 – War of 1812 (Sixty Years' War)
 Battle of St. Regis – 1812 – War of 1812 (Sixty Years' War)
 Battle of Wild Cat Creek – 1812 – War of 1812 (Sixty Years' War)
 Battle of the Mississinewa – 1812 – War of 1812 (Sixty Years' War)
 Battle of Frenchtown – 1813 – War of 1812 (Sixty Years' War)
 Battle of Ogdensburg – 1813 – War of 1812 (Sixty Years' War)
 Battle of Rosillo Creek – 1813 – Gutiérrez–Magee Expedition (Mexican War of Independence) [Spanish American wars of independence]
 Bombardment of Lewes – 1813 – War of 1812 (Sixty Years' War)
 Battle of Africa Point – 1813 – War of 1812 (Sixty Years' War)
 Battle of Tipton's Island – 1813 – War of 1812 (Sixty Years' War)
 Siege of Fort Meigs – 1813 – War of 1812 (Sixty Years' War)
 Raid on Havre de Grace – 1813 – War of 1812 (Sixty Years' War)
 Second Battle of Sacket's Harbor – 1813 – War of 1812 (Sixty Years' War)
 Raid on Sodus – 1813 – War of 1812 (Sixty Years' War)
 Battle of Alazan Creek – 1813 – Gutiérrez–Magee Expedition (Mexican War of Independence) [Spanish American wars of independence]
 Battle of Craney Island – 1813 – War of 1812 (Sixty Years' War)
 Raid on Fort Schlosser – 1813 – War of 1812 (Sixty Years' War)
 Raid on Black Rock – 1813 – War of 1812 (Sixty Years' War)
 Battle of Burnt Corn – 1813 – Creek War (War of 1812 and American Indian Wars)
 Battle of Fort Stephenson – 1813 – War of 1812 (Sixty Years' War)
 Battle of St. Michaels – 1813 – War of 1812 (Sixty Years' War)
 Battle of Medina – 1813 – Gutiérrez–Magee Expedition (Mexican War of Independence) [Spanish American wars of independence]
 Second Battle of St. Michaels – 1813 – War of 1812 (Sixty Years' War)
 Fort Mims massacre – 1813 – Creek War (War of 1812 and American Indian Wars)
 Battle of Lake Erie – 1813 – War of 1812 (Sixty Years' War)
 Bashi Skirmish – 1813 – Creek War (War of 1812 and American Indian Wars)
 Battle of Tallushatchee – 1813 – Creek War (War of 1812 and American Indian Wars)
 Battle of Talladega – 1813 – Creek War (War of 1812 and American Indian Wars)
 Canoe Fight (Creek War) – 1813 – Creek War (War of 1812 and American Indian Wars)
 Battle of Autossee – 1813 – Creek War (War of 1812 and American Indian Wars)
 Capture of Fort Niagara – 1813 – War of 1812 (Sixty Years' War)
 Battle of Lewiston – 1813 – War of 1812 (Sixty Years' War)
 Battle of Holy Ground – 1813 – Creek War (War of 1812 and American Indian Wars)
 Battle of Buffalo – 1813 – War of 1812 (Sixty Years' War)
 Battles of Emuckfaw and Enotachopo Creek – 1814 – Creek War (War of 1812 and American Indian Wars)
 Battle of Calebee Creek – 1814 – Creek War (War of 1812 and American Indian Wars)
 Battle of Horseshoe Bend – 1814 – Creek War (War of 1812 and American Indian Wars)
 Battle of Fort Oswego (1814) – 1814 – War of 1812 (Sixty Years' War)
 Battle of Big Sandy Creek – 1814 – War of 1812 (Sixty Years' War)
 Siege of Prairie du Chien – 1814 – War of 1812 (Sixty Years' War)
 Battle of Rock Island Rapids – 1814 – War of 1812 (Sixty Years' War)
 Battle of Mackinac Island (1814) – 1814 – War of 1812 (Sixty Years' War)
 Battle of Conjocta Creek – 1814 – War of 1812 (Sixty Years' War)
 Battle of Bladensburg – 1814 – War of 1812 (Sixty Years' War)
 Burning of Washington – 1814 – War of 1812 (Sixty Years' War)
 Raid on Alexandria (Virginia) – 1814 – War of 1812 (Sixty Years' War)
 Battle of Caulk's Field – 1814 – War of 1812 (Sixty Years' War)
 Battle of Hampden – 1814 – War of 1812 (Sixty Years' War)
 Battle of Plattsburgh – 1814 – War of 1812 (Sixty Years' War)
 Battle of North Point – 1814 – War of 1812 (Sixty Years' War)
 Battle of Baltimore – 1814 – War of 1812 (Sixty Years' War)
 First battle of Fort Bowyer – 1814 – War of 1812 (Sixty Years' War)
 Defense of the cutter Eagle – 1814 – War of 1812 (Sixty Years' War)
 Battle of Pensacola (1814) – 1814 – War of 1812 (Sixty Years' War)
 Skirmish at Farnham Church – 1814 – War of 1812 (Sixty Years' War)
 Battle of Lake Borgne – 1814 – War of 1812 (Sixty Years' War)
 Battle of New Orleans – 1815 – War of 1812 (Sixty Years' War)
 Siege of Fort St. Philip (1815) – 1815 – War of 1812 (Sixty Years' War)
 Battle of Fort Peter – 1815 – War of 1812 (Sixty Years' War)
 Second battle of Fort Bowyer – 1815 – War of 1812 (Sixty Years' War)
 Battle of Negro Fort – 1816 – First Seminole War
 Battle of Stillman's Run – 1832 – Black Hawk War (American Indian Wars)
 Buffalo Grove ambush – 1832 – Black Hawk War (American Indian Wars)
 Plum River raid – 1832 – Black Hawk War (American Indian Wars)
 Indian Creek massacre – 1832 – Black Hawk War (American Indian Wars)
 St. Vrain massacre – 1832 – Black Hawk War (American Indian Wars)
 Attacks at Fort Blue Mounds – 1832 – Black Hawk War (American Indian Wars)
 Spafford Farm massacre – 1832 – Black Hawk War (American Indian Wars)
 Battle of Kellogg's Grove – 1832 – Black Hawk War (American Indian Wars)
 Battle of Horseshoe Bend (1832) – 1832 – Black Hawk War (American Indian Wars)
 Attack at Ament's Cabin – 1832 – Black Hawk War (American Indian Wars)
 Battle of Waddams Grove – 1832 – Black Hawk War (American Indian Wars)
 Battle of Apple River Fort – 1832 – Black Hawk War (American Indian Wars)
 Sinsinawa Mound raid – 1832 – Black Hawk War (American Indian Wars)
 Battle of Wisconsin Heights – 1832 – Black Hawk War (American Indian Wars)
 Battle of Bad Axe – 1832 – Black Hawk War (American Indian Wars)
 San Felipe incident (1835) – 1835 – Texas Revolution
 Battle of Gonzales – 1835 – Texas Revolution
 Battle of Goliad – 1835 – Texas Revolution
 Siege of Béxar – 1835 – Texas Revolution
 Battle of Concepción – 1835 – Texas Revolution
 Battle of Lipantitlán – 1835 – Texas Revolution
 Grass Fight – 1835 – Texas Revolution
 Dade battle – 1835 – Second Seminole War
 Battle of Ouithlacoochie – 1835 – Second Seminole War
 Battle of the Alamo – 1836 – Texas Revolution
 Battle of San Patricio – 1836 – Texas Revolution
 Battle of Agua Dulce – 1836 – Texas Revolution
 Battle of Refugio – 1836 – Texas Revolution
 Battle of Coleto – 1836 – Texas Revolution
 Battle of San Jacinto – 1836 – Texas Revolution
 Fort Parker massacre – 1836 – Texas–Indian wars (American Indian Wars)
 Battle of San Felasco Hammock – 1836 – Second Seminole War
 Battle of Wahoo Swamp – 1836 – Second Seminole War
 Battle of Stone Houses – 1837 – Texas–Indian wars (American Indian Wars)
 Battle of Lake Okeechobee – 1837 – Second Seminole War
 Battles of the Loxahatchee – 1838 – Second Seminole War
 Battle of Pine Island Ridge – 1838 – Second Seminole War
 Arroyo Seco Fight – 1838 – Texas–Indian wars (American Indian Wars)
 Killough massacre – 1838 – Texas–Indian wars (American Indian Wars)
 Battle of Crooked River – 1838 – 1838 Mormon War
 Battle of the San Gabriels – 1839 – Texas–Indian wars (American Indian Wars)
 Battle of the Neches – 1839 – Texas–Indian wars (American Indian Wars)
 Council House Fight – 1840 – Texas–Indian wars (American Indian Wars)
 Great Raid of 1840 – 1840 – Texas–Indian wars (American Indian Wars)
 Battle of Plum Creek – 1840 – Texas–Indian wars (American Indian Wars)
 Battle of Village Creek – 1841 – Texas–Indian wars (American Indian Wars)
 Battle of Bandera Pass – 1841 or 1843 – Texas–Indian wars (American Indian Wars)
 Battle of the Diablo Mountains – 1854 – Texas–Indian wars and Apache Wars (American Indian Wars)
 Battle of Devil's River – 1857 – Texas–Indian wars and Comanche Wars (American Indian Wars)
 Battle of Little Robe Creek – 1858 – Texas–Indian wars, Apache Wars and Comanche Wars (American Indian Wars)
 Second Battle of Fort Defiance – 1860 – Navajo Wars
 Battle of Pease River – 1860 – Texas–Indian wars (American Indian Wars)
 Battle of Pecos River – 1864 – Navajo Wars
 Battle of Canyon de Chelly – 1864 – Navajo Wars
 First Battle of Adobe Walls – 1864 – Texas–Indian wars and Apache Wars (American Indian Wars)
 Warren Wagon Train raid – 1871 – Texas–Indian wars (American Indian Wars)
 Battle of Blanco Canyon – 1871 – Comanche campaign (Texas–Indian wars) [American Indian Wars]
 Battle of the North Fork of the Red River – 1872 – Texas–Indian wars (American Indian Wars)
 Second Battle of Adobe Walls – 1874 – Texas–Indian wars and Red River War (American Indian Wars)
 Battle of Palo Duro Canyon – 1874 – Texas–Indian wars and Red River War (American Indian Wars)
 Battle of Yellow House Canyon – 1877 – Buffalo Hunters' War (Texas–Indian wars and Apache Wars) [American Indian Wars]
 Padre Canyon incident – 1899 – Navajo Wars
 Battle of Bear Valley – 1918 – Yaqui Wars
 Battle of Aleutian Islands – World War II
 Battle of Athens (Missouri) – 1861 – American Civil War
 Battle of Ball's Bluff – 1861 – American Civil War
 Battle of Belmont – 1861 – American Civil War
 Battle of Big Bethel – 1861 – American Civil War
 Battle of Blackburn's Ford – 1861 – American Civil War
 Battle of Boonville – 1861 – American Civil War
 Battle of Hoke's Run – 1861 – American Civil War
 Battle of Carnifex Ferry – 1861 – American Civil War
 Battle of Dry Wood Creek – 1861 – American Civil War
 Battle of Aquia Creek – 1861 – American Civil War
 Battle of Antietam – 1862 – American Civil War
 Battle of Goldsboro Bridge – 1862 – American Civil War
 Battle of Chickasaw Bayou – 1862 – American Civil War
 Battle of Bayou Fourche – 1863 – American Civil War
 Battle of Athens (Alabama) – 1864 – American Civil War
 Battle of Nashville – 1864 – American Civil War
 Battle of Blair Mountain
 Battle of Appomattox Courthouse – 1865 – American Civil War
 Battle of Carthage (Missouri) – 1861 – American Civil War
 Battle of Chancellorsville Virginia – 1863 – American Civil War
 Battle of the Chesapeake
 Battle of Cheat Mountain [West] Virginia – 1861 – American Civil War
 Battle of Chickamauga – 1861 – American Civil War
 Battle of Church house – 1864 – American Civil War
 Battle of Concord – 1775 – American Revolutionary War
 Battle of Crown Point
 Battle of Cumberland Church
 Battles of Dalton – 1864 – American Civil War
 Battle of Drewry's Bluff
 Battle of Fish Hook Ridge – World War II
 Battle of Fort Donelson
 Battle of Fort Clark
 Battle of Fort Sumter
 Battle of Fort Ticonderoga
 Battle of Fort William Henry
 Battle of Front Royal
 Battle of Germantown
 Battle of Gettysburg
 Battle of Ivy Mountain
 Battle of Kessler's Cross Lanes
 Battle of Lexington
 Battle of the Little Bighorn
 Battle of Long Island
 First Battle of Manassas
 Second Battle of Manassas
 Battle of Midway
 Battle of Monongahela River (Braddock's defeat)
 Battle of Morton's Ford
 Battle of Mossy Creek
 Battle of New Orleans
 Battle of Perry Hill
 Battle of Princeton Courthouse
 Battle of Rich Mountain
 Battle of Round Mountain
 Battle of Sewell's Point
 Battle of Shiloh
 Battle of Sitka
 Battle of Spotsylvania Court House
 Battle of Springfield (1780)
 First Battle of Springfield (1861)
 Second Battle of Springfield (1863)
 First Battle of the Stronghold
 Battle of Stones River
 Battle of Trenton
 Battle of White Plains
 Battle of the Wilderness
 Battle of Wilson's Creek
 Siege of Yorktown
 Siege of Yorktown (1862)

Uruguay 

 Siege of Colonia del Sacramento – 1704 – War of the Spanish Succession
 Battle of Cardal – 1807 – British invasions of the River Plate (Anglo-Spanish War (1796–1808)) [French Revolutionary and Napoleonic Wars]
 Battle of Montevideo (1807) – 1807 – British invasions of the River Plate (Anglo-Spanish War (1796–1808)) [French Revolutionary and Napoleonic Wars]
 Battle of Las Piedras (1811) – 1811 – Second Banda Oriental campaign (Argentine War of Independence) [Spanish American wars of independence]
 Siege of Montevideo (1811) – 1811 – Second Banda Oriental campaign (Argentine War of Independence) [Spanish American wars of independence]
 Siege of Montevideo (1812–1814) – 1812 – 1814 – Second Banda Oriental campaign (Argentine War of Independence) [Spanish American wars of independence]
 Battle of Cerrito – 1812 – Second Banda Oriental campaign (Argentine War of Independence) [Spanish American wars of independence]
 Battle of Buceo – 1814 – Second Banda Oriental campaign (Argentine War of Independence) [Spanish American wars of independence]
 Battle of India Muerta – 1816 – Portuguese conquest of the Banda Oriental
 Battle of Sauce (1816) – 1816 – Portuguese conquest of the Banda Oriental
 Battle of Arapey – 1817 – Portuguese conquest of the Banda Oriental
 Battle of Catalán – 1817 – Portuguese conquest of the Banda Oriental
 Battle of Paso Cuello – 1817 – Portuguese conquest of the Banda Oriental
 Battle of Arroyo Grande (1818) – 1818 – Portuguese conquest of the Banda Oriental
 Battle of Tacuarembó – 1820 – Portuguese conquest of the Banda Oriental
 Siege of Montevideo (1823) – 1823 – 1824 – War of Independence of Brazil
 Battle of Montevideo (1823) – 1823 – War of Independence of Brazil
 Battle of Sarandí – 1825 – Cisplatine War
 Battle of Colonia del Sacramento (1826) – 1826 – Cisplatine War
 Battle of Juncal – 1827 – Cisplatine War
 Great Siege of Montevideo – 1843 – 1851 – Uruguayan Civil War and Platine War

Uzbekistan 

 Battle of Gol-Zarriun – c. 560 – Hephthalite–Sasanian Wars
 Battle of Baykand – 729 – Muslim conquest of Transoxiana
 Siege of Kamarja – 729 – Muslim conquest of Transoxiana
 Battle of the Defile – 731 – Muslim conquest of Transoxiana
 Siege of Bukhara – 1220 – Mongol invasion of the Khwarazmian Empire
 Siege of Samarkand (1220) – 1220 – Mongol invasion of the Khwarazmian Empire
 Siege of Qarshi – 1366 – 1370 – Timurid conquests and invasions
 First siege of Shahrukhiya – 1461 – Timurid wars of succession
 Siege of Shahrukhiya – 1462 – 1463 – Timurid wars of succession
 Battle of the Chirciq River – 1488 – Timurid-Moghul Wars
 Siege of Samarkand (1497) – 1497 – Timurid-Uzbek Wars and Timurid wars of succession
 Siege of Samarkand (1501) – 1501
 Battle of Ghazdewan – 1512 – Timurid-Uzbek Wars and Persian–Uzbek wars

Venezuela
 Battle of La Guaira – 1743 – War of Jenkins' Ear (War of the Austrian Succession)
 Battle of Puerto Cabello – 1743 – War of Jenkins' Ear (War of the Austrian Succession)
 Cutting out of the Hermione – 1799 – Anglo-Spanish War (1796–1808) (French Revolutionary and Napoleonic Wars)
 Battle of La Victoria (1812) – 1812 – Venezuelan War of Independence
 Battle of La Guaira (1812) – 1812 – War of 1812 (Sixty Years' War)
 Battle of Alto de los Godos – 1813 – Venezuelan War of Independence
 Battle of Niquitao – 1813 – Admirable Campaign (Venezuelan War of Independence)
 Battle of Los Horcones – 1813 – Admirable Campaign (Venezuelan War of Independence)
 Battle of Taguanes – 1813 – Admirable Campaign (Venezuelan War of Independence)
 Battle of Araure – 1813 – Venezuelan War of Independence
 Battle of La Victoria – 1814 – Venezuelan War of Independence
 Battle of San Mateo – 1814 – Venezuelan War of Independence
 Battle of Carabobo (1814) – 1814 – Venezuelan War of Independence
 Battle of Urica – 1814 – Venezuelan War of Independence
 Battle of San Félix – 1817 – Venezuelan War of Independence
 Battle of Matasiete – 1817 – Venezuelan War of Independence
 Battle of Las Queseras del Medio – 1819 – Venezuelan War of Independence
 Battle of Carabobo – 1821 – Venezuelan War of Independence
 Battle of Lake Maracaibo – 1823 – Venezuelan War of Independence
 Battle of Santa Inés – 1859 – Federal War
 Battle of Coplé – 1860 – Federal War
 Battle of Buchivacoa – 1862 – Federal War

Vietnam
 Battle of Bạch Đằng (938) – 938
 Battle of Bạch Đằng (981) – 981
 Battle of Bình Lệ Nguyên – 1251 – Mongol invasions of Vietnam
 Battle of Thị Nại Bay – 1283 – Mongol invasions of Vietnam
 Battle of Chương Dương – 1285 – Mongol invasions of Vietnam
 Battle of Bạch Đằng (1288) – 1288 – Mongol invasions of Vietnam
 Battle of Vijaya – 1377 – Champa–Đại Việt War (1367–1390)
 Battle of the Gianh River (1643) – 1643 – Trịnh–Nguyễn War
 Battle of Rạch Gầm-Xoài Mút – 1785 – Tây Sơn wars and Siamese–Vietnamese wars
 Battle of Ngọc Hồi-Đống Đa – 1788 – 1789 – Tây Sơn wars and Ten Great Campaigns
 Battle of Yu Oc - 1884 - Tonkin Campaign
 Battle of Nui Bop - 1885 - Tonkin Campaign
 Battle of Đồng Đăng - 1885 - Tonkin Campaign
 Battle of Hòa Mộc - 1885 - Tonkin Campaign
 Battle of Route Coloniale 4 – 1950 – First Indochina War
 Battle of Dien Bien Phu – 1954 – First Indochina War
 Battle of Ap Bac – 1963 – Vietnam War
 Battle of Ia Drang – 1965 – Vietnam War
 Battle of Ba Gia – 1965 – Vietnam War
 Battle of Binh Gia – 1965 – Vietnam War
 Battle of Đồng Xoài – 1965 – Vietnam War
 Battle of Long Tan – 1966 – Vietnam War
 Battle of Dak To – 1967 – Vietnam War
 Battle of Ong Thanh – 1967 – Vietnam War
 Battle of Huế – 1968 – Vietnam War
 Battle of Khe Sanh – 1968 – Vietnam War
 Battle of Hamburger Hill – 1969 – Vietnam War
 Battle of Hill 723 – 1971 – Vietnam War
 Battle of Ban Dong – 1971 – Vietnam War
 Battle of Phước Long – 1975 – Vietnam War
 Battle of Ban Me Thuot – 1975 – Vietnam War

Wales
 Caratacus's last battle – 50 – Roman conquest of Britain
 Roman conquest of Anglesey – 60 or 61 – Roman conquest of Britain
 Roman conquest of Anglesey – 77 – Roman conquest of Britain
 Battle of Cefn Digoll – c. 630 – Anglo-Saxon settlement of Britain
 Battle of Buttington – 893 – Danelaw (Viking activity in the British Isles)
 Battle of Mynydd Carn – 1081 – Welsh dynastic struggle
 Battle of Llwchwr – 1136 – Norman invasion of Wales
 Battle of Crug Mawr – 1136 – Norman invasion of Wales
 Battle of Mynydd Hyddgen – 1401 – Welsh Revolt
 Battle of Tuthill – 1401 – Welsh Revolt
 Battle of Bryn Glas – 1402 – Welsh Revolt
 Battle of Stalling Down – 1403 – Welsh Revolt
 Battle of Grosmont – 1405 – Welsh Revolt
 Battle of Pwll Melyn or Battle of Usk – 1405 – Welsh Revolt
 Relief of Montgomery Castle – 1644 – First English Civil War, 1644 (First English Civil War) [Wars of the Three Kingdoms]
 Battle of Denbigh Green – 1645 – First English Civil War, 1645 (First English Civil War) [Wars of the Three Kingdoms]
 Battle of St. Fagans – 1648 – Second English Civil War (Wars of the Three Kingdoms)
 Siege of Pembroke – 1648 – Second English Civil War (Wars of the Three Kingdoms)
 Battle of Y Dalar Hir – 1648 – Second English Civil War (Wars of the Three Kingdoms)
 Battle of Fishguard – 1797 – War of the First Coalition (French Revolutionary Wars)

Yemen
 Siege of Sanaa (570) – 570 – Aksumite–Persian wars
 Expedition to Kamaran – 1523 – Ottoman–Portuguese confrontations
 Battle of Ash-Shihr (1531) – 1531 – Ottoman–Portuguese confrontations
 Capture of Aden (1548) – 1548 – Ottoman–Portuguese conflicts (1538–1559) (Ottoman–Portuguese confrontations)
 Battle of Ash-Shihr (1548) – 1548 – Ottoman–Portuguese conflicts (1538–1559) (Ottoman–Portuguese confrontations)
 Battle of Bab al-Mandab – 1551 – Ottoman–Portuguese conflicts (1538–1559) (Ottoman–Portuguese confrontations)
 Attack on Mocha – 1558 – Ottoman–Portuguese conflicts (1538–1559) (Ottoman–Portuguese confrontations)
 Battle of Kamaran – 1560 – Ottoman–Portuguese confrontations
 Battle of Aden (1586) – 1586 – Ottoman–Portuguese confrontations
 Battle of Sana'a – 2011 – 2011 Yemeni uprising

References

 Geographic